= List of Eucosma species =

This is a list of 698 species in the genus Eucosma.

== Eucosma species ==
- Eucosma abacana Erschoff, 1877
- Eucosma abathrodes Meyrick, 1937
- Eucosma abruptana Walsingham, 1879
- Eucosma abstemia Meyrick, 1932
- Eucosma accipitrina Meyrick, 1913
- Eucosma acrosema Turner, 1946
- Eucosma actuosa Meyrick, 1913
- Eucosma adamantana Guenée, 1845
- Eucosma adustana Hübner, 1811/18
- Eucosma aeana McDunnough, 1942
- Eucosma aellaea Turner, 1916
- Eucosma aemulana Schlager, 1848
- Eucosma aeriana Falkovich, 1962
- Eucosma afflicta Falkovich, 1964
- Eucosma aganodes Meyrick, 1922
- Eucosma agassizii Robinson, 1867
- Eucosma agnatana Christoph, 1872
- Eucosma agricolana Walsingham, 1879
- Eucosma agriochlora Meyrick, 1929
- Eucosma albarracina Hartig, 1941
- Eucosma albertana (McDunnough, 1925)
- Eucosma albicosta Falkovich, 1964
- Eucosma albicostella Turati & Krüger, 1936
- Eucosma albidula Walsingham, 1914
- Eucosma albidulana Herrich-Schäffer
- Eucosma albiguttana Zeller, 1875
- Eucosma albosectana Mabille, 1906
- Eucosma albuneana Zeller, 1847
- Eucosma alphabetica Walsingham, 1914
- Eucosma amara Meyrick, 1913
- Eucosma ambodaidaleia (Miller, 1983)
- Eucosma amellana Preissecker, 1930
- Eucosma ammopastea Turner, 1946
- Eucosma amphorana (Walsingham, 1879)
- Eucosma amulana Walsingham, 1914
- Eucosma anisodelta Meyrick, 1923
- Eucosma anisospila Turner, 1946
- Eucosma annana Kennel, 1918
- Eucosma annetteana (Kearfott, 1907)
- Eucosma anserana Heinemann, 1863
- Eucosma antidora Meyrick, 1921
- Eucosma antirrhoa Meyrick, 1920
- Eucosma apacheana (Walsingham, 1884)
- Eucosma apicinota Turner, 1946
- Eucosma apocrypha Falkovich, 1964
- Eucosma aprilana (Grote, 1877)
- Eucosma argentialbana Walsingham, 1879
- Eucosma argentifera Razowski, 1972
- Eucosma argutipunctana (Blanchard & Knudson, 1983) (coastal phaneta moth)
- Eucosma argyrocyma Meyrick, 1922
- Eucosma artemisiana (Walsingham, 1879)
- Eucosma aspersa Turner, 1946
- Eucosma aspidana Walsingham, 1884
- Eucosma aspidiscana Hübner, 1811/18
- Eucosma astragalana Staudinger, 1871
- Eucosma atascosana Blanchard, 1980
- Eucosma atelosticta Meyrick, 1922
- Eucosma atomosana Walsingham, 1879
- Eucosma atricapilla Meyrick, 1917
- Eucosma atripunctis Turner, 1946
- Eucosma aulacota Turner, 1946
- Eucosma aurantiradix Kuznetsov, 1962
- Eucosma aurilineana Ferris, 2005
- Eucosma aurita Meyrick, 1920
- Eucosma austera Turner, 1946
- Eucosma austerana Kennel, 1916
- Eucosma australis Kuznetsov, 1988
- Eucosma austrina Miller, 1985
- Eucosma autochthones Walsingham, 1897
- Eucosma autumnana (McDunnough, 1942)
- Eucosma avalona McDunnough, 1938
- Eucosma awemeana (Kearfott, 1907)
- Eucosma bactromorpha Diakonoff, 1992
- Eucosma bactropa Meyrick, 1927
- Eucosma balatonana Osthelder, 1937
- Eucosma barbara Miller, 1974
- Eucosma bavarica Obraztsov, 1952
- Eucosma benignata McDunnough, 1925
- Eucosma beryllina Meyrick, 1927
- Eucosma betana McDunnough, 1942
- Eucosma bidenticulana Bradley, 1957
- Eucosma bilineana Kearfott, 1907
- Eucosma biplagata Walsingham, 1895
- Eucosma bipunctella Walker, 1863
- Eucosma biquadrana (Walsingham, 1879)
- Eucosma bisecta Meyrick, 1918
- Eucosma bobana Kearfott, 1907
- Eucosma bolanderana Walsingham, 1879
- Eucosma boxcana Kearfott, 1907
- Eucosma brachysticta Meyrick, 1935
- Eucosma brightonana Kearfott, 1907
- Eucosma brigittana Kennel, 1918
- Eucosma caementana Christoph, 1872
- Eucosma caflisciana Frey, 1880
- Eucosma calculosa Meyrick, 1913
- Eucosma caliacrana (Caradja, 1931)
- Eucosma calliarma Meyrick, 1909
- Eucosma calligrapha Meyrick, 1912
- Eucosma campoliliana ([Denis & Schiffermuller], 1775)
- Eucosma cana Haworth, 1811
- Eucosma canana Walsingham, 1879
- Eucosma canariana Kearfott, 1907
- Eucosma candidulana Nolck.
- Eucosma caniceps Walsingham, 1884
- Eucosma canusana (Wright, 1997)
- Eucosma capitulata Meyrick, 1907
- Eucosma capnoleuca Meyrick, 1932
- Eucosma carcharitis Meyrick, 1924
- Eucosma carolinana Walsingham, 1895
- Eucosma caryocrossa Meyrick, 1932
- Eucosma cataclystiana Walker, 1863
- Eucosma cataglypta Meyrick, 1935
- Eucosma catamochla Meyrick, 1932
- Eucosma catharaspis (Meyrick, 1922)
- Eucosma cathareutis Meyrick, 1938
- Eucosma catoptrana Rebel, 1903
- Eucosma cecidogena Kieffer, 1908
- Eucosma centraspis Meyrick, 1926
- Eucosma ceratodes Turner, 1946
- Eucosma cerdalea Walsingham, 1914
- Eucosma ceriodes Meyrick, 1909
- Eucosma certana Kuznetsov, 1967
- Eucosma cetratana Kennel, 1901
- Eucosma charmera Turner, 1946
- Eucosma chionophricta Meyrick, 1922
- Eucosma chlorobathra Meyrick, 1911
- Eucosma chloromima Meyrick, 1931
- Eucosma chlorosticha Meyrick, 1934
- Eucosma chloroterma Meyrick, 1913
- Eucosma chloroticana Zeller, 1877
- Eucosma chrysyphis Razowski, 1972
- Eucosma circulana Hübner, 1823
- Eucosma cittopa Walsingham, 1914
- Eucosma clarescens Kuznetsov, 1964
- Eucosma clarifica Meyrick, 1913
- Eucosma clavana Zeller, 1875 (striped eucosma)
- Eucosma claypoleana Riley, 1882
- Eucosma clepsidoma Meyrick, 1916
- Eucosma climacosema Meyrick, 1938
- Eucosma cnephasiana Obraztsov, 1943
- Eucosma coagulana Kennel, 1901
- Eucosma cocana Kearfott, 1907
- Eucosma comatulana Zeller, 1875
- Eucosma conformana Mann, 1872
- Eucosma confunda Kuznetsov, 1966
- Eucosma coniogramma Clarke, 1976
- Eucosma consobrinana Heinrich, 1923
- Eucosma consociana Heinrich, 1923
- Eucosma conspiciendana Heinrich, 1923
- Eucosma conterminana Herrich-Schäffer, 1835
- Eucosma contrariana Christoph, 1881
- Eucosma corculana (Zeller, 1874)
- Eucosma corosana (Walsingham, 1884)
- Eucosma costastrigulana Kearfott, 1908
- Eucosma couleruana Duponchel, 1835
- Eucosma crambitana Walsingham, 1879
- Eucosma crassana (McDunnough, 1938)
- Eucosma cremastropis Meyrick, 1930
- Eucosma cremnitis Meyrick, 1912
- Eucosma cretaceana Kennel, 1899
- Eucosma crymalana Powell, 1968
- Eucosma culmana Müller-Rutz, 1932
- Eucosma cumilana Guenée, 1845
- Eucosma cyphospila Meyrick, 1920
- Eucosma dalmatana Rebel, 1891
- Eucosma dapsilis Heinrich, 1929
- Eucosma dasycera Turner, 1946
- Eucosma decipiens Meyrick, 1918
- Eucosma defensa Meyrick, 1922
- Eucosma deflexana Heinrich, 1923
- Eucosma deltoplac Meyrick, 1921
- Eucosma deltozyga Meyrick, 1928
- Eucosma demarniana Fischer von Röslerstamm, 1839
- Eucosma denigratana (Kennel, 1901)
- Eucosma denverana Kearfott, 1907
- Eucosma derelicta Heinrich, 1929
- Eucosma deruptana Kennel, 1901
- Eucosma descipiens Meyrick
- Eucosma desertana Zeller, 1875
- Eucosma desipiens Meyrick, 1918
- Eucosma diabolana Blanchard, 1980
- Eucosma diaema Turner, 1946
- Eucosma diakonoffi Gibeaux, 1984
- Eucosma dianthes Meyrick, 1928
- Eucosma digna Meyrick, 1917
- Eucosma dilatana Walsingham, 1895
- Eucosma diogma Meyrick, 1927
- Eucosma directa Meyrick, 1912
- Eucosma discernata Kuznetsov, 1966
- Eucosma discretivana Heinrich, 1921
- Eucosma disjectana Kennel, 1921
- Eucosma dodana Kearfott, 1907
- Eucosma doiinthanonensis Kawabe, 1989
- Eucosma dolichosticha Turner, 1946
- Eucosma dorsiatomana (Kearfott, 1905)
- Eucosma dorsisignatana Clemens, 1860
- Eucosma dorsisuffusana Kearfott, 1908
- Eucosma drastica Meyrick, 1918
- Eucosma dryocarpa Meyrick, 1925
- Eucosma dryochra Meyrick, 1937
- Eucosma ebenocosma Turner, 1946
- Eucosma eburata Heinrich, 1929
- Eucosma elaeochroa Walsingham, 1914
- Eucosma elongana (Walsingham, 1879)
- Eucosma elutana Kennel, 1900
- Eucosma emaciatana Walsingham, 1884
- Eucosma ephedrana Christoph, 1877
- Eucosma erebantra Meyrick, 1937
- Eucosma ericetana Herrich-Schäffer, 1836
- Eucosma eridarcha Meyrick, 1927
- Eucosma eridela Turner, 1946
- Eucosma esmodes Meyrick, 1937
- Eucosma essexana (Kearfott, 1907) (Essex phaneta moth)
- Eucosma euphraticana Amsel, 1935
- Eucosma euprepes Turner, 1946
- Eucosma euryochra Bradley, 1962
- Eucosma eurypolia Turner, 1946
- Eucosma eutechna Meyrick, 1936
- Eucosma evidens Meyrick, 1917
- Eucosma exacerbatricana Heinrich, 1923
- Eucosma excerptionana Heinrich, 1923
- Eucosma exclusoriana Heinrich, 1923
- Eucosma excusabilis Heinrich, 1923
- Eucosma explicatana Kennel, 1900
- Eucosma exquisitana Christoph, 1881
- Eucosma externa Eversmann, 1844
- Eucosma fandana Kearfott, 1907
- Eucosma favicolor Meyrick, 1927
- Eucosma featmiana McDunnough
- Eucosma fernaldana Grote, 1880
- Eucosma ferruginana (Fernald, 1882) (ferruginous phaneta moth)
- Eucosma fervidana Zeller, 1847
- Eucosma fibuligera Meyrick, 1934
- Eucosma fiskeana Kearfott, 1905
- Eucosma flavispecula Kuznetsov, 1964
- Eucosma florescens Meyrick, 1925
- Eucosma floridana Kearfott, 1907
- Eucosma fofana Kearfott, 1907
- Eucosma formosana (Clemens, 1860) (beautiful eucosma moth)
- Eucosma fortunana Kearfott, 1907
- Eucosma franclemonti Powell, 1968
- Eucosma fraudabilis Heinrich, 1923
- Eucosma fraudulentana Kennel, 1901
- Eucosma fritillana Blanchard & Knudson, [1982]
- Eucosma fugitivana Meyrick, 1882
- Eucosma fulminana Walsingham, 1879
- Eucosma fulvana Stephens
- Eucosma fulvotegulana Wright & Gilligan, 2015
- Eucosma funesta Filipjev, 1931
- Eucosma fuscana Kearfott, 1907
- Eucosma fuscicaput Diakonoff, 1948
- Eucosma fuscida Kuznetsov, 1966
- Eucosma fusculana Zeller, 1847
- Eucosma galactitis Meyrick, 1912
- Eucosma galenapunctana Kearfott, 1908
- Eucosma gandana Kearfott, 1907
- Eucosma getonia Razowski, 1972
- Eucosma giarabubensis Turati, 1930
- Eucosma giganteana (Riley, 1881) (giant eucosma)
- Eucosma gilletteana Dyar, 1903
- Eucosma glandulosana Walsingham, 1907
- Eucosma glebana Snellen, 1883
- Eucosma glomerana Walsingham, 1879
- Eucosma gloriola Heinrich, 1931
- Eucosma glyphicodes Meyrick, 1918
- Eucosma gomonana Kearfott, 1907
- Eucosma gomphacma Meyrick, 1928
- Eucosma gonzalezalvarezi Agenjo, [1970]
- Eucosma gorodkovi Kuznetsov, 1979
- Eucosma graciliana Kearfott, 1905
- Eucosma gracilis Filipjev, 1925
- Eucosma gracilistria Turner, 1946
- Eucosma gradensis Galvagni, 1909
- Eucosma graduatana Walsingham, 1879
- Eucosma grandana Kearfott, 1907
- Eucosma grandiflavana Walsingham, 1879
- Eucosma granulatana (Kearfott, 1908)
- Eucosma graziella Blanchard, 1968
- Eucosma grindeliana (Busck, 1906)
- Eucosma griseana Hübner, 1796/99
- Eucosma griselda Blanchard & Knudson, [1982]
- Eucosma griseocapitana (Walsingham, 1879)
- Eucosma grossbecki Heinrich, 1923
- Eucosma guentheri Tengström
- Eucosma guttulana Blanchard
- Eucosma gypsatana Kennel, 1921
- Eucosma haberhaueri Kennel, 1901
- Eucosma habrotoma Meyrick, 1934
- Eucosma handana Kearfott, 1907
- Eucosma hapalosarca Meyrick, 1924
- Eucosma hartigi Lucas, 1942
- Eucosma hasseanthi Clarke, 1952
- Eucosma haydenae Wright, 2006
- Eucosma hazelana Klots, 1936
- Eucosma heathiana Kearfott, 1907
- Eucosma hebescana Kuznetsov, 1986
- Eucosma heinrichi McDunnough, 1925
- Eucosma hennei Clarke, 1947
- Eucosma hesperidana Kennel, 1921
- Eucosma hirsutana Walsingham, 1879
- Eucosma hohana Kearfott, 1907
- Eucosma hohenwartiana ([Denis & Schiffermuller], 1775)
- Eucosma hubneriana Zeller, 1846
- Eucosma hygroberylla Meyrick, 1937
- Eucosma hyponomeutana Walsingham, 1895
- Eucosma ignotana Caradja, 1916
- Eucosma immaculana Kearfott, 1907
- Eucosma impatiens Meyrick, 1921
- Eucosma imposita Meyrick, 1937
- Eucosma incana Zeller, 1846
- Eucosma incinerana Constant, 1888
- Eucosma indagatricana (Heinrich, 1923)
- Eucosma indecorana Rebel, 1907
- Eucosma indeterminana (McDunnough, 1925)
- Eucosma individiosana Kennel, 1901
- Eucosma infausta Walsingham, 1881
- Eucosma infelix Heinrich, 1923
- Eucosma infessana Walsingham, 1900
- Eucosma infida Hübner, 1828
- Eucosma infimbriana (Dyar, 1904)
- Eucosma infirmana Kennel, 1900
- Eucosma influana (Heinrich, 1923)
- Eucosma inquadrana Walsingham, 1884
- Eucosma inscita Meyrick, 1913
- Eucosma insidiosana Heinrich, 1923
- Eucosma insolens Meyrick, 1909
- Eucosma intacta Walsingham, 1900
- Eucosma inteimediana Kennel, 1900
- Eucosma invicta Walsingham, 1895
- Eucosma involucrata Meyrick, 1927
- Eucosma iographa Diakonoff, 1967
- Eucosma ioplintha Meyrick, 1930
- Eucosma ioreas Meyrick, 1920
- Eucosma irroratana Walsingham, 1879
- Eucosma ischnobathra Meyrick, 1938
- Eucosma jansei Diakonoff, 1956
- Eucosma jejunana McDunnough, 1942
- Eucosma jerusalemana Amsel, 1935
- Eucosma johnsonana Kearfott, 1907
- Eucosma juncticiliana Walsingham, 1879
- Eucosma kemnerana Lewin, 1942
- Eucosma ketamana Amsel, 1956
- Eucosma kiscana (Kearfott, 1907)
- Eucosma knudsoni Wright & Gilligan, 2015
- Eucosma kokana Kearfott, 1907
- Eucosma krygeri Rebel, 1937
- Eucosma kurdistana Amsel, 1959
- Eucosma lacteana Treitschke, 1835
- Eucosma landana Kearfott, 1907
- Eucosma langstoni Powell, 1963
- Eucosma larana Walsingham, 1879
- Eucosma lathami Forbes, 1937
- Eucosma laticurva Heinrich, 1929
- Eucosma legitima Meyrick, 1912
- Eucosma lepidana Walsingham, 1929
- Eucosma leptancistra Meyrick, 1925
- Eucosma leptozona Meyrick, 1921
- Eucosma leucatma Turner, 1926
- Eucosma leucodesma Meyrick, 1911
- Eucosma leucomesana Walker, 1863
- Eucosma leuconephela Turner, 1946
- Eucosma leuconota Turner, 1946
- Eucosma leucopetra Meyrick, 1908
- Eucosma leucopleura Turner, 1946
- Eucosma leucotoma Diakonoff, 1964
- Eucosma lignana Snellen, 1883
- Eucosma lineolana Kuznetsov, 1964
- Eucosma linitipunctana (Blanchard & Knudson, 1983) (sand dune eucosma)
- Eucosma lioplintha Meyrick, 1920
- Eucosma litorea Wright & Brown, 2014
- Eucosma liturana (Walsingham, 1879)
- Eucosma lobiferana Moore, 1887
- Eucosma lobostola Meyrick, 1921
- Eucosma lochmaea Meyrick, 1920
- Eucosma lolana Kearfott, 1907
- Eucosma longipalpana Möschler, 1890
- Eucosma louisana McDunnough, 1944
- Eucosma loxaspis Meyrick, 1931
- Eucosma luciana Chrétien, 1908
- Eucosma lugubrana Treitschke, 1830
- Eucosma luridana Walsingham, 1879
- Eucosma lustromarginata Walsingham, 1897
- Eucosma lutrocopa Meyrick, 1914
- Eucosma lyallana McDunnough, 1935
- Eucosma lyrana Snellen, 1883
- Eucosma maculatana Walsingham, 1879
- Eucosma magnana Kuznetzov, 1978
- Eucosma magnidicana Heinrich, 1923
- Eucosma malacodes Meyrick, 1911
- Eucosma malitiosana Kennel, 1901
- Eucosma mancipiana Mann, 1855
- Eucosma marmara Meyrick, 1909
- Eucosma marmarophanes Meyrick, 1934
- Eucosma marocana Lucas, 1954
- Eucosma matutina Grote, 1893
- Eucosma mediostriata Walsingham, 1895
- Eucosma melanocosma Turner, 1916
- Eucosma meridaspis Meyrick, 1922
- Eucosma meridospila Meyrick, 1922
- Eucosma messingiana Fischer von Röslerstamm, 1837
- Eucosma metagrapta Meyrick, 1932
- Eucosma metagypsa Meyrick, 1920
- Eucosma metamorphica Meyrick, 1928
- Eucosma metana Kennel, 1918
- Eucosma metaspilana Walker, 1863
- Eucosma metria Falkovich, 1964
- Eucosma metzneriana Treitschke, 1830
- Eucosma micropterana (Turati, 1930)
- Eucosma microsignata Heinrich, 1929
- Eucosma migratana (Heinrich, 1923)
- Eucosma mirana Caradja, 1916
- Eucosma mirificana (Peyerimhoff, 1877)
- Eucosma mirosignata Heinrich, 1929
- Eucosma misturana (Heinrich, 1923)
- Eucosma mobilensis Heinrich, 1923
- Eucosma mochlophorana Meyrick, 1882
- Eucosma modicana Zeller, 1847
- Eucosma modicellana (Heinrich, 1923)
- Eucosma mollita Meyrick, 1931
- Eucosma momana Kearfott, 1907
- Eucosma monitorana Heinrich, 1920
- Eucosma monitrix Meyrick, 1909
- Eucosma monoensis Powell, 1968
- Eucosma monogrammana Zeller, 1875
- Eucosma monstratana Rebel, 1906
- Eucosma montanana (Walsingham, 1884)
- Eucosma mormonensis (Heinrich, 1923)
- Eucosma morrisoni Walsingham, 1884
- Eucosma muguraxana Kostyuk, 1975
- Eucosma muliebris Meyrick, 1922
- Eucosma muscosa Meyrick, 1927
- Eucosma nandana Kearfott, 1907
- Eucosma nasuta Meyrick, 1911
- Eucosma nereidopa Meyrick, 1927
- Eucosma nesiotes Walsingham, 1897
- Eucosma nessebarana Soffner, 1962
- Eucosma neurosticha Turner, 1946
- Eucosma nigromaculana Haworth, 1811
- Eucosma niphaspis Meyrick, 1928
- Eucosma nipponica Kawabe, 1976
- Eucosma nitida Turner, 1946
- Eucosma nitidulana Zeller, 1846
- Eucosma nitorana Kuznetsov, 1962
- Eucosma niveicaput Walsingham, 1900
- Eucosma niveipalpis Meyrick, 1938
- Eucosma noctivola Meyrick, 1932
- Eucosma nolckeniana Zeller, 1877
- Eucosma nordini Wright, 2005
- Eucosma notanthes Meyrick, 1936
- Eucosma notialis Miller, 1985
- Eucosma numellata Meyrick, 1912
- Eucosma numerosana Zeller, 1875
- Eucosma nuntia Heinrich, 1929
- Eucosma obfuscana Riley, 1888
- Eucosma obscurana Stephens, 1834
- Eucosma obumbratana Zeller, 1846
- Eucosma ochraceana Fernald, 1901
- Eucosma ochricostana Razowski, 1972
- Eucosma ochrocephala (Walsingham, 1895) (pale-headed eucosma)
- Eucosma ochroterminana (Kearfott, 1907) (buff-tipped eucosma)
- Eucosma ocladias Meyrick, 1906
- Eucosma oculatana Kennel, 1900
- Eucosma odotatana Kennel, 1901
- Eucosma offectalis (Hulst, 1886)
- Eucosma okubiensis Kawabe, 1987
- Eucosma olivaceana (olivaceous eucosma)
- Eucosma ommatoptera Falkovich, 1965
- Eucosma operta Meyrick, 1917
- Eucosma ophionana McDunnough, 1925
- Eucosma opsia Meyrick, 1911
- Eucosma opsonoma Meyrick, 1918
- Eucosma optimana Dyar, 1903
- Eucosma oregonensis (Heinrich, 1923)
- Eucosma ornatula (Heinrich, 1924)
- Eucosma orphnogenes Meyrick, 1939
- Eucosma orthopeda Meyrick, 1934
- Eucosma ottoniana Kennel, 1919
- Eucosma pachyneura Turner, 1916
- Eucosma paetulana Kennel, 1900
- Eucosma palabundana Heinrich, 1923
- Eucosma pallidarcis (Heinrich, 1923)
- Eucosma pallidicostana (Walsingham, 1879)
- Eucosma pamirana Kuznetsov, 1972
- Eucosma pandana Kearfott, 1907
- Eucosma paracremna Meyrick, 1913
- Eucosma paradelta Meyrick, 1925
- Eucosma parmatana (Clemens, 1860)
- Eucosma parvana (Walsingham, 1879)
- Eucosma parvulana (Wilkinson, 1859)
- Eucosma passiva Meyrick, 1913
- Eucosma pauperana Duponchel, 1842
- Eucosma pediasios Miller, 1985
- Eucosma pedisignata Diakonoff, 1948
- Eucosma pentagonaspis Meyrick, 1931
- Eucosma peraea Meyrick, 1911
- Eucosma perangustana (Walsingham, 1879)
- Eucosma perdricana Walsingham, 1879
- Eucosma perfectana Walker, 1863
- Eucosma perfixa Turner, 1916
- Eucosma pergandeana Fernald, 1905
- Eucosma pergratana Rebel, 1914
- Eucosma periculosana Heinrich, 1923
- Eucosma periptycha Turner, 1946
- Eucosma perplexa Turner, 1916
- Eucosma persiae Razowski, 1963
- Eucosma persolita Heinrich, 1929
- Eucosma perversa Turner, 1946
- Eucosma pervicax Meyrick, 1911
- Eucosma petalonota Meyrick, 1937
- Eucosma pflugiana Fabricius, 1787
- Eucosma phaecochyta Bradley, 1965
- Eucosma phaedropa Turner, 1946
- Eucosma phaeochyta Bradley, 1965
- Eucosma phaeoloma Turner, 1946
- Eucosma phaeoscia Meyrick, 1916
- Eucosma pharangodes Meyrick, 1920
- Eucosma phoenocrossa Meyrick, 1925
- Eucosma pica Walsingham, 1900
- Eucosma picrodella Meyrick, 1932
- Eucosma piperata Wright, 2005
- Eucosma platanaspis Meyrick, 1934
- Eucosma plumbaginea Meyrick, 1931
- Eucosma pollutana Zeller, 1877
- Eucosma polymita Turner, 1946
- Eucosma polyphaea Turner, 1926
- Eucosma polyplega Turner, 1946
- Eucosma polyxena Meyrick, 1937
- Eucosma ponderosa Powell, 1968
- Eucosma porpota Meyrick, 1907
- Eucosma potamias Meyrick, 1909
- Eucosma praesumptiosa Heinrich, 1923
- Eucosma primulana Walsingham, 1879
- Eucosma pristinana Zeller, 1877
- Eucosma procellariana Walker, 1863
- Eucosma procellosa Meyrick, 1917
- Eucosma projecta Meyrick, 1921
- Eucosma prominens Meyrick, 1922
- Eucosma proximana Caradja, 1928
- Eucosma prudens Meyrick, 1917
- Eucosma psychrodora Meyrick, 1936
- Eucosma pulveratana Walsingham, 1879
- Eucosma pupillana Hübner, 1796
- Eucosma purpurissatana Heinrich, 1923
- Eucosma pylonitis Meyrick, 1932
- Eucosma pyricolana Murtfeldt, 1891
- Eucosma pyrrhulana Zeller, 1877
- Eucosma quinquemaculana Robinson, 1869
- Eucosma radiatana (Walsingham, 1879)
- Eucosma radiolana Eversmann, 1844
- Eucosma ragonoti Walsingham, 1895
- Eucosma raracana (Kearfott, 1907) (reddish eucosma)
- Eucosma rasdolnyana Christoph, 1882
- Eucosma recentana Zerny, 1934
- Eucosma referenda Meyrick, 1921
- Eucosma regionalis Meyrick, 1934
- Eucosma religiosa Meyrick, 1917
- Eucosma rescissoriana Heinrich, 1920
- Eucosma resumptana Walker, 1863
- Eucosma rhymogramma Meyrick, 1916
- Eucosma riciniata Meyrick, 1911
- Eucosma ridingsana Robinson, 1869
- Eucosma rigena Meyrick, 1938
- Eucosma rigidana Snellen, 1883
- Eucosma rindgei Miller, 1985
- Eucosma robinsonana Grote, 1872
- Eucosma rosaocellana Knudson, 1986
- Eucosma roseni Obraztsov, 1952
- Eucosma rubescena Constant, 1895
- Eucosma rufescens Meyrick, 1913
- Eucosma rupestrana (McDunnough, 1925)
- Eucosma russeola Heinrich, 1929
- Eucosma rusticana Kearfott, 1905
- Eucosma saburrana Zeller, 1852
- Eucosma salaciana Blanchard & Knudson, [1982]
- Eucosma saliciana Clemens, 1864
- Eucosma salticola Meyrick, 1913
- Eucosma samoana Rebel, 1915
- Eucosma sandana Kearfott, 1907
- Eucosma sandiego Kearfott, 1908
- Eucosma sandonia Meyrick, 1908
- Eucosma sandycitis Meyrick, 1916
- Eucosma sardoensis Rebel, 1936
- Eucosma satellitana Zeller, 1877
- Eucosma saussureana Benander, 1928
- Eucosma scenica Meyrick, 1911
- Eucosma scopoliana Haworth, 1811
- Eucosma scopulosana Meyrick, 1881
- Eucosma scorzonerana Benander, 1942
- Eucosma scutana Constant, 1893
- Eucosma scutiformis Meyrick, 1931
- Eucosma segregata (Heinrich, 1924)
- Eucosma selenana Mabille, 1900
- Eucosma semicurva Meyrick, 1912
- Eucosma semirufana Christoph, 1882
- Eucosma serapicana Heinrich, 1923
- Eucosma serpentana Walsingham, 1895
- Eucosma shastana Walsingham, 1897
- Eucosma siccescens Meyrick, 1912
- Eucosma sierrae Blanchard & Knudson, 1983
- Eucosma similiana Clemens, 1860
- Eucosma simplex McDunnough, 1925
- Eucosma sinensis Walsingham, 1900
- Eucosma siskiyouana (Kearfott, 1907)
- Eucosma smithiana (Walsingham, 1895)
- Eucosma snyderana Kearfott, 1907
- Eucosma sollenis Meyrick, 1913
- Eucosma somalica Durrant, 1916
- Eucosma sombreana Kearfott, 1905
- Eucosma sonomana Kearfott, 1907
- Eucosma sororiana Heinrich, 1923
- Eucosma sosana Kearfott, 1907
- Eucosma spaldingana Kearfott, 1907
- Eucosma sparactis Meyrick, 1928
- Eucosma sparsana Rebel, 1935
- Eucosma speculatrix Meyrick, 1907
- Eucosma sperryana McDunnough, 1942
- Eucosma sphalerodes Meyrick, 1934
- Eucosma spicea Meyrick, 1912
- Eucosma spiculana (Zeller, 1875)
- Eucosma spiculifera Meyrick, 1913
- Eucosma stramineana (Walsingham, 1879)
- Eucosma strenuana Walker, 1863
- Eucosma striatana (Clemens, 1860) (striated eucosma)
- Eucosma striatiradix Kuznetsov, 1964
- Eucosma striatulana Walsingham, 1900
- Eucosma striphromita Turner, 1946
- Eucosma suadana Heinrich, 1923
- Eucosma subcorticana Snellen, 1883
- Eucosma subdecora Meyrick, 1922
- Eucosma subflavana Walsingham, 1879
- Eucosma subinvicta Kearfott, 1907
- Eucosma sublucidana Kennel, 1901
- Eucosma submicans Walsingham, 1897
- Eucosma subminimana (Heinrich, 1923)
- Eucosma suomiana Hoffmann, 1893
- Eucosma superciliosa Meyrick, 1920
- Eucosma sybillana Kennel, 1918
- Eucosma symbola Meyrick, 1909
- Eucosma symbolaspis Meyrick, 1927
- Eucosma symploca Turner, 1946
- Eucosma syntaractis Turner, 1946
- Eucosma tandana Kearfott, 1907
- Eucosma tantillana Fuchs, 1903
- Eucosma taophanes Meyrick, 1922
- Eucosma taosana Wright, 2005
- Eucosma tapina Turner, 1946
- Eucosma tarandana (Möschler, 1874)
- Eucosma teliferana Christoph, 1881
- Eucosma temenitis Meyrick, 1911
- Eucosma tenax Meyrick, 1920
- Eucosma tetraplana Möschler, 1866
- Eucosma thalameuta Meyrick, 1918
- Eucosma thematica Meyrick, 1918
- Eucosma tholera Falkovich, 1964
- Eucosma tholeropis Meyrick, 1934
- Eucosma tocullionana Heinrich, 1920
- Eucosma tomonana Kearfott, 1907 (aster-head eucosma moth)
- Eucosma tonitrualis Meyrick, 1934
- Eucosma tornocosma Turner, 1946
- Eucosma tornocycla Turner, 1946
- Eucosma torrens Meyrick, 1927
- Eucosma totana Kearfott, 1907
- Eucosma transfixa Turner, 1946
- Eucosma translucens Walsingham, 1914
- Eucosma transmutata Meyrick, 1931
- Eucosma tremula Meyrick, 1909
- Eucosma trepida Meyrick, 1911
- Eucosma triangulana Meyrick, 1881
- Eucosma tridentata Walsingham, 1914
- Eucosma trilithopa Meyrick, 1937
- Eucosma trimarginata Walsingham, 1914
- Eucosma tripartitana Zeller, 1875
- Eucosma tripoliana (Barrett, 1880)
- Eucosma tumulata Meyrick, 1908
- Eucosma tundrana Kennel, 1900
- Eucosma umbrastriana (Kearfott, 1907)
- Eucosma umbratana Staudinger, 1880
- Eucosma urbana Kennel, 1901
- Eucosma urnigera Meyrick, 1937
- Eucosma ursulana Kennel, 1918
- Eucosma vagana McDunnough, 1925
- Eucosma vancouverana McDunnough, 1925
- Eucosma variana Clemens, 1864
- Eucosma verecundana Caradja, 1916
- Eucosma verna Miller, 1971 (speckled eucosma moth)
- Eucosma veternana Zeller, 1877
- Eucosma victoriana Kennel, 1918
- Eucosma vittata Walsingham, 1914
- Eucosma vulpecularis Meyrick, 1932
- Eucosma walsinghami Kearfott, 1907
- Eucosma wandana Kearfott, 1907
- Eucosma watertonana McDunnough, 1925
- Eucosma williamsi Powell, 1963
- Eucosma wimmerana Treitschke, 1835
- Eucosma xenarcha Meyrick, 1920
- Eucosma xerophloea Meyrick, 1933
- Eucosma yasudai Nasu, 1982
- Eucosma zelota Meyrick, 1916
