= Apocydia =

Scientific classification
- Kingdom: Animalia
- Phylum: Arthropoda
- Class: Insecta
- Order: Lepidoptera
- Family: Tortricidae
- Tribe: Grapholitini
- Genus: Apocydia; Horak & Komai, 2006

Genus of tortrix moths

Apocydia is a genus of moths of the family Tortricidae.

== Species ==
- Apocydia pervicax (Meyrick, 1911)

== See also ==
- List of Tortricidae genera
