= Eucosma muguraxana =

Scientific classification
- Kingdom: Animalia
- Phylum: Arthropoda
- Clade: Pancrustacea
- Class: Insecta
- Order: Lepidoptera
- Family: Tortricidae
- Genus: Eucosma
- Species: E. muguraxana

Binomial name
- Eucosma muguraxana Kostyuk, 1975

Species of moth

Eucosma muguraxana is a species of moth of the family Tortricidae. It is found in China and Russia.
