= Eucosma rhymogramma =

Scientific classification
- Kingdom: Animalia
- Phylum: Arthropoda
- Class: Insecta
- Order: Lepidoptera
- Family: Tortricidae
- Genus: Eucosma
- Species: E. rhymogramma

Binomial name
- Eucosma rhymogramma Meyrick, 1916

Species of moth

Eucosma rhymogramma is a moth of the family Tortricidae first described by Edward Meyrick in 1916. It is found in Sri Lanka and Myanmar.
