= Eucosma caliacrana =

Scientific classification
- Kingdom: Animalia
- Phylum: Arthropoda
- Clade: Pancrustacea
- Class: Insecta
- Order: Lepidoptera
- Family: Tortricidae
- Genus: Eucosma
- Species: E. caliacrana

Binomial name
- Eucosma caliacrana (Caradja, 1931)

Synonyms
- Semasia luciana caliacrana Caradja, 1931; Eucosma (Phaneta) galactica Obraztsov, 1968; Semasia luciana Kennel, 1919; Semasia nessebarana Soffner, 1962

Species of moth

Eucosma caliacrana is a species of moth of the family Tortricidae. It is found in China, Mongolia, Japan, Russia, Romania and Bulgaria.
