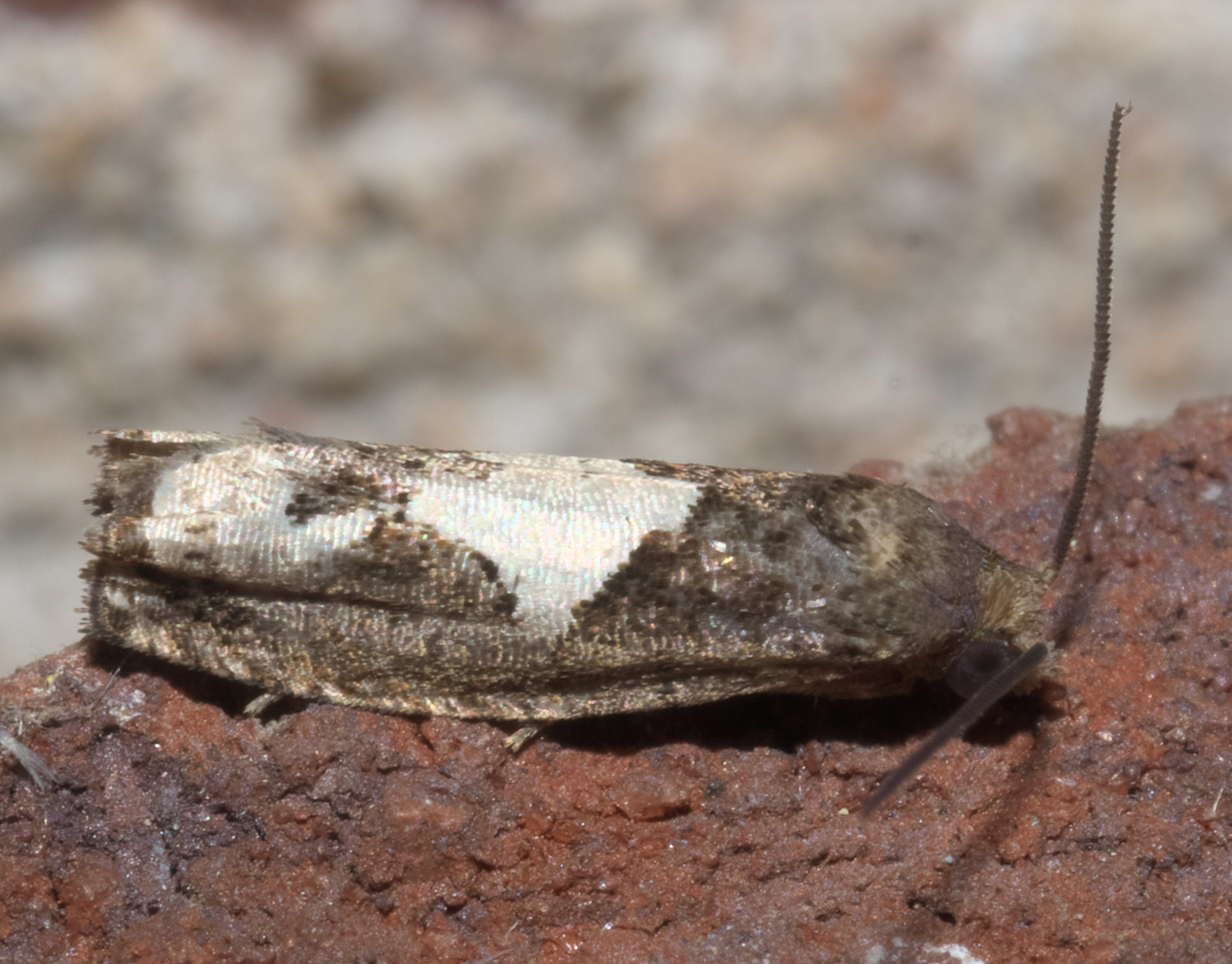

Scientific classification
- Kingdom: Animalia
- Phylum: Arthropoda
- Clade: Pancrustacea
- Class: Insecta
- Order: Lepidoptera
- Family: Tortricidae
- Subfamily: Olethreutinae
- Tribe: Eucosmini
- Genus: Eucosma
- Species: E. parmatana

Binomial name
- Eucosma parmatana (Clemens, 1860)

= Eucosma parmatana =

Species of moth

Eucosma parmatana is a species of olethreutine leafroller moth in the family Tortricidae. It is found in North America.
