= Eucosma catharaspis =

Scientific classification
- Kingdom: Animalia
- Phylum: Arthropoda
- Clade: Pancrustacea
- Class: Insecta
- Order: Lepidoptera
- Family: Tortricidae
- Genus: Eucosma
- Species: E. catharaspis

Binomial name
- Eucosma catharaspis (Meyrick, 1922)

Synonyms
- Ancylis catharaspis Meyrick, 1922; Eucosma cataraspis Razowski, 1960

Species of moth

Eucosma catharaspis is a species of moth of the family Tortricidae. It is found in China (Jilin, Shanghai, Henan, Anhui), Korea, Japan and Russia.
