= Holocola phaeoscia =

Scientific classification
- Kingdom: Animalia
- Phylum: Arthropoda
- Class: Insecta
- Order: Lepidoptera
- Family: Tortricidae
- Genus: Holocola
- Species: H. phaeoscia

Binomial name
- Holocola phaeoscia (Turner, 1916)

Synonyms
- Eucosma phaeoscia Turner, 1916; Eucosma leuconota Turner, 1946

Species of moth

Holocola phaeoscia is a species of moth of the family Tortricidae. It is found in Australia, where it has been recorded from Queensland and New South Wales.

The wingspan is about 14 mm. The forewings are fuscous, the costal fold barred with dark fuscous. There is a dark-fuscous basal patch and a suffused grey-whitish dorsal streak to a large dark-fuscous blotch in disc before the middle, succeeded by a small ochreous-brown suffusion towards the dorsum. The hindwings are grey.
