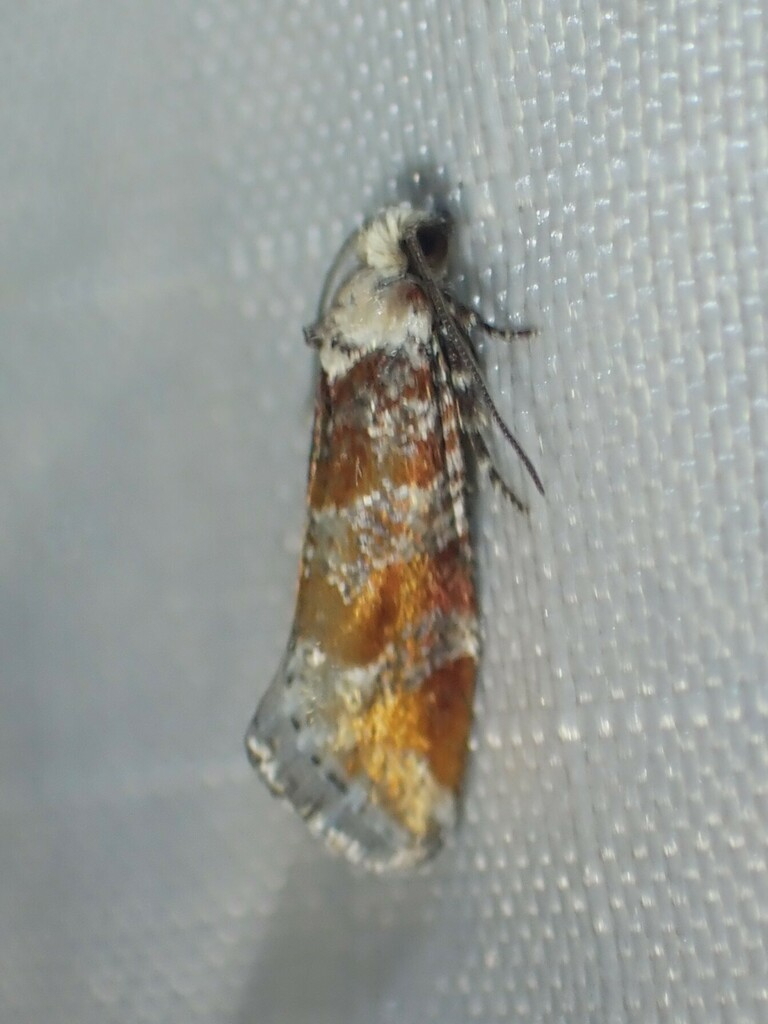

Scientific classification
- Kingdom: Animalia
- Phylum: Arthropoda
- Clade: Pancrustacea
- Class: Insecta
- Order: Lepidoptera
- Family: Tortricidae
- Genus: Eucosma
- Species: E. gloriola

Binomial name
- Eucosma gloriola Heinrich, 1931

= Eucosma gloriola =

Species of moth

Eucosma gloriola, the eastern pine shoot borer, is a moth of the family Tortricidae. It is found from eastern Canada, south to Virginia, and west to Minnesota.

The wingspan is 14–16 mm. There is one generation per year.

The larvae feed on Pinus species, mainly Pinus strobus and Pinus sylvestris.

== Gallery ==
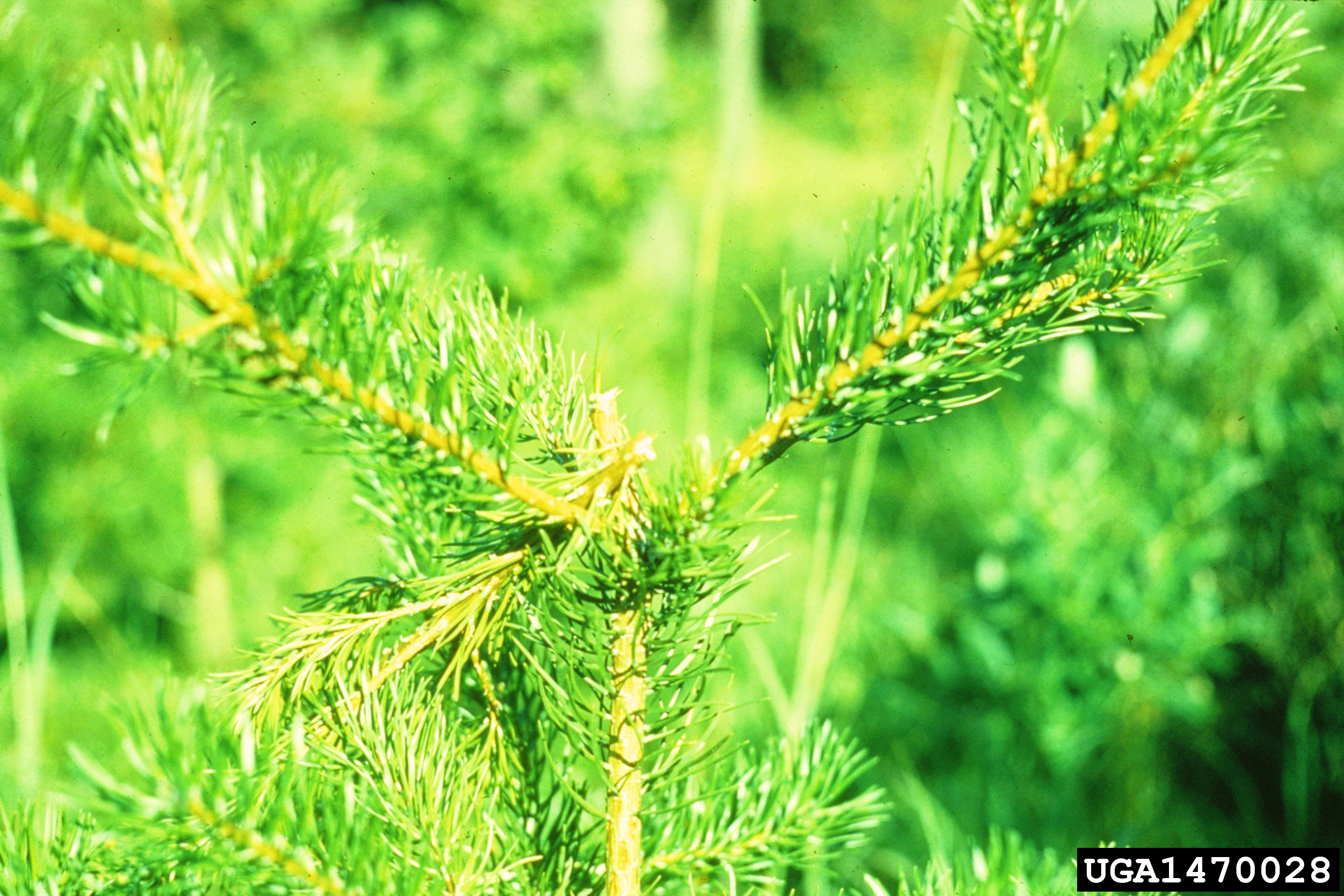
Damage

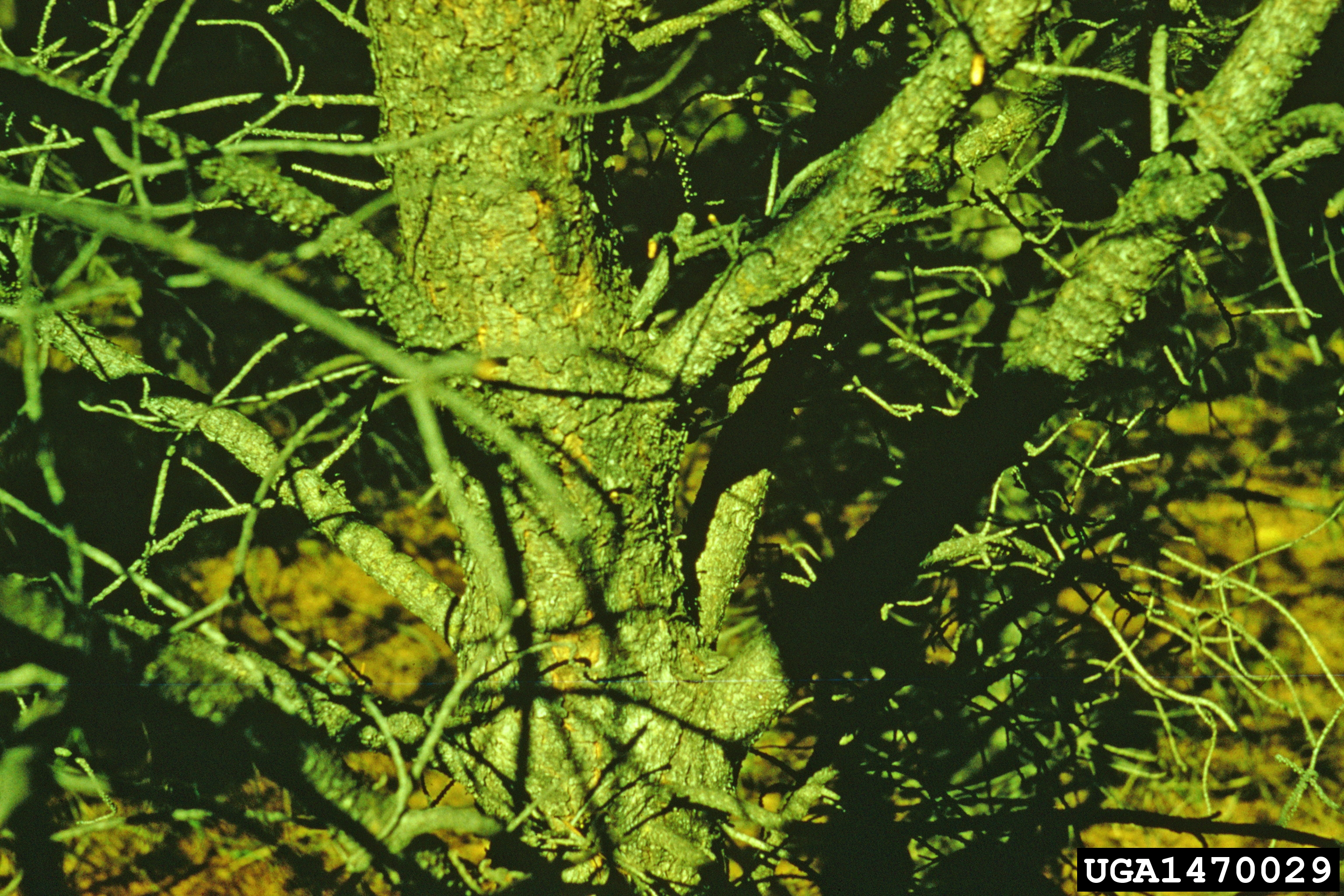
Damage

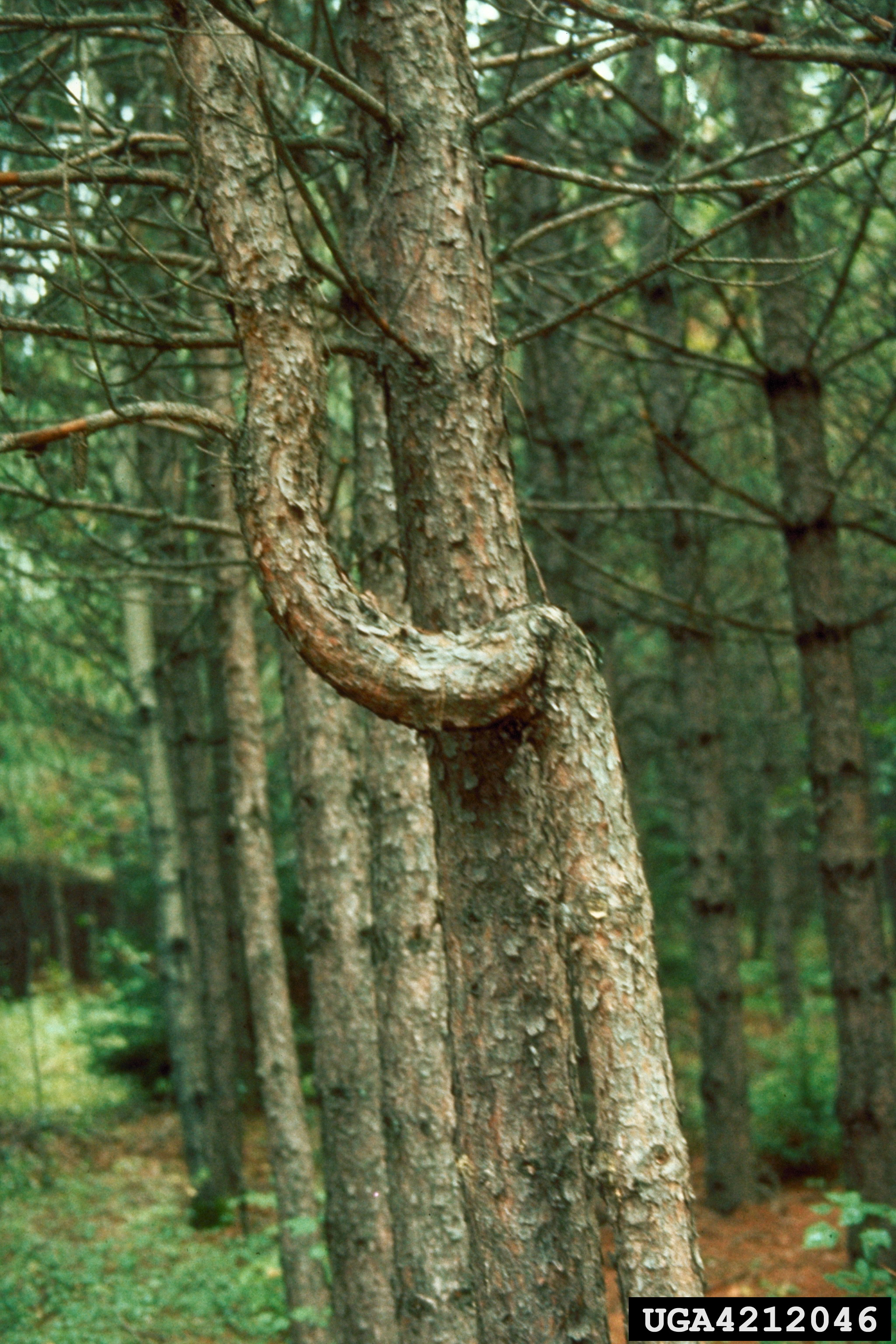
Damage
