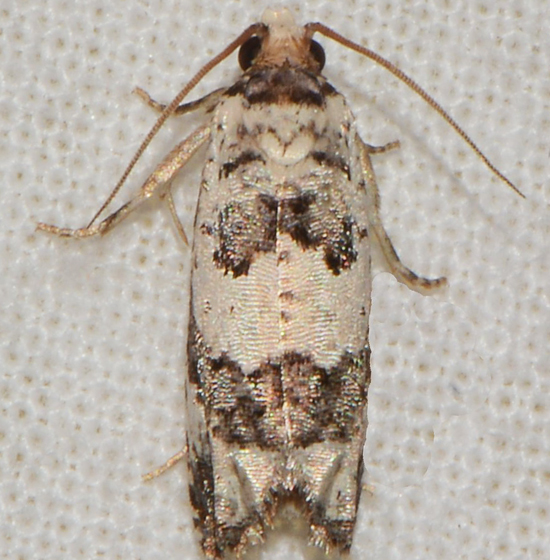

Scientific classification
- Kingdom: Animalia
- Phylum: Arthropoda
- Clade: Pancrustacea
- Class: Insecta
- Order: Lepidoptera
- Family: Tortricidae
- Genus: Eucosma
- Species: E. matutina

Binomial name
- Eucosma matutina (Grote, 1873)

Synonyms
- Penthina matutina Grote, 1873; Pelochrista matutina; Eucosma grotiana Kearfott, 1908

= Eucosma matutina =

Species of moth

Eucosma matutina is a species of moth of the family Tortricidae. It is found in the United States, where it has been recorded from Alabama, Colorado, Illinois, Indiana, Iowa, Kansas, Kentucky, Maine, Massachusetts, Michigan, Minnesota, Mississippi, Montana, New Mexico, Ohio, Oklahoma, Ontario, Texas, Utah, Vermont and Wisconsin.

The wingspan is about 16.5 mm.
