= Eucosma nitorana =

Scientific classification
- Kingdom: Animalia
- Phylum: Arthropoda
- Clade: Pancrustacea
- Class: Insecta
- Order: Lepidoptera
- Family: Tortricidae
- Genus: Eucosma
- Species: E. nitorana

Binomial name
- Eucosma nitorana Kuznetsov, 1962

Species of moth

Eucosma nitorana is a species of moth of the family Tortricidae. It is found in China and the Russian Far East.
