= Apocydia pervicax =

Scientific classification
- Kingdom: Animalia
- Phylum: Arthropoda
- Class: Insecta
- Order: Lepidoptera
- Family: Tortricidae
- Genus: Apocydia
- Species: A. pervicax

Binomial name
- Apocydia pervicax (Meyrick, 1911)

Synonyms
- Eucosma pervicax Meyrick, 1911; Laspeyresia ferraria Turner, 1916; Eucosma dolichosticha Turner, 1946; Eucosma aspersa Turner, 1946

Species of moth from Australia

Apocydia pervicax is a species of moth of the family Tortricidae. It is found in Australia, where it has been recorded from Queensland, New South Wales and the Northern Territory.

The wingspan is about 12 mm. The forewings are fuscous, with reddish-brown suffusion, especially near the base and fold. There are dark-fuscous oblique costal streaks, margined with reddish brown. The hindwings are fuscous, but paler towards the base.
