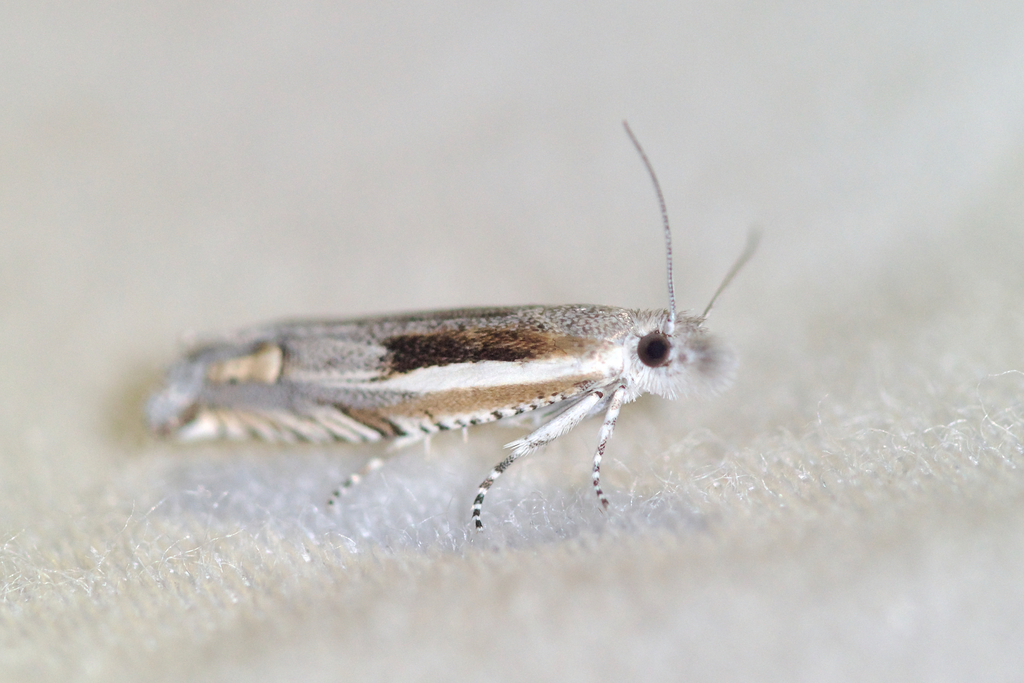

Scientific classification
- Kingdom: Animalia
- Phylum: Arthropoda
- Clade: Pancrustacea
- Class: Insecta
- Order: Lepidoptera
- Family: Tortricidae
- Genus: Eucosma
- Species: E. clavana

Binomial name
- Eucosma clavana (Fernald, 1882)

Synonyms
- Semasia clavana Fernald, 1882; Phaneta clavana

= Eucosma clavana =

Species of moth

Eucosma clavana, the lanced phaneta or striped phaneta moth, is a species of moth found in North America, where it has been recorded from scattered locations from California to Maine. It has not been recorded from the south-eastern United States or the Great Plains. The species is listed as threatened in the US state of Connecticut. The species was first described by Charles H. Fernald in 1882.

The wingspan is about 14 mm.
