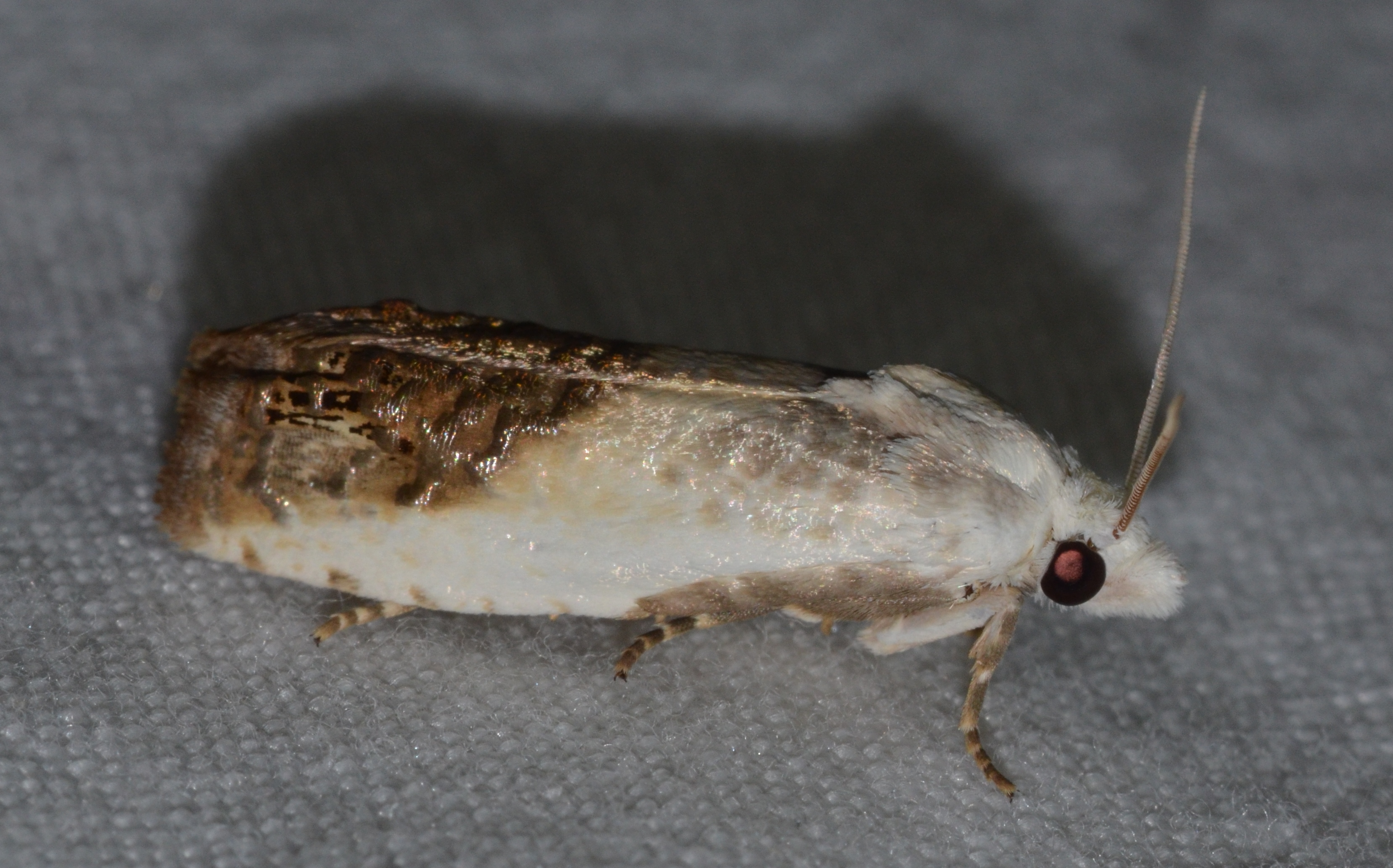

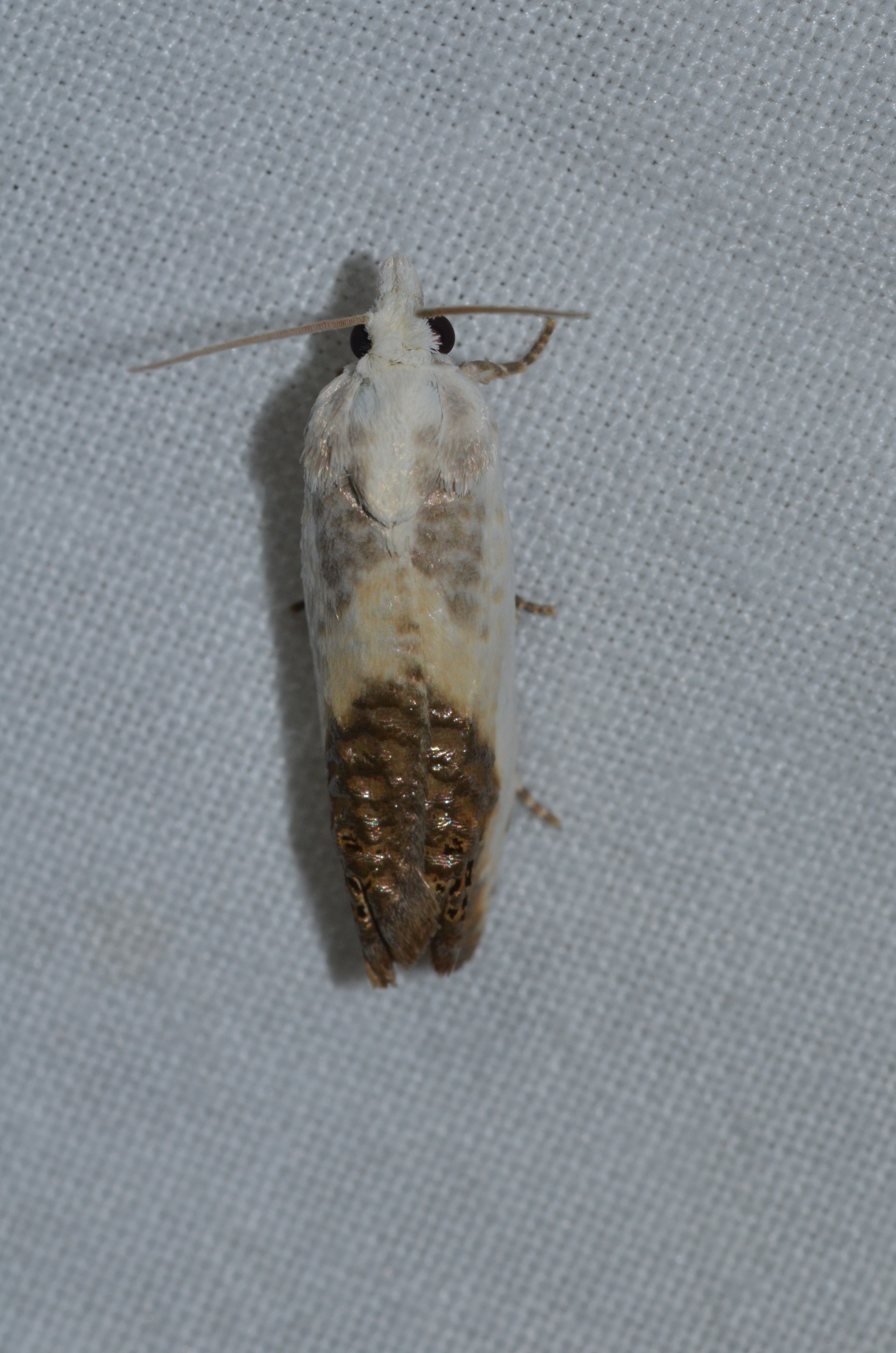

Scientific classification
- Kingdom: Animalia
- Phylum: Arthropoda
- Clade: Pancrustacea
- Class: Insecta
- Order: Lepidoptera
- Family: Tortricidae
- Genus: Eucosma
- Species: E. giganteana

Binomial name
- Eucosma giganteana (Riley, 1881)

Synonyms
- Paedisca giganteana Riley, 1881; Eucosma giganteana minorata Heinrich, 1924

= Eucosma giganteana =

Species of moth

Eucosma giganteana, the giant eucosma moth, is a species of moth of the family Tortricidae. It is found in the United States, where it has been recorded from North Carolina to Florida, Minnesota to Texas, as well as in Pennsylvania, North Dakota and New Mexico.

The wingspan is 34–38 mm. Adults are on wing in January and from April to September.

The larvae feed on Silphium perfoliatum.
