= Eucosma striatulana =

Scientific classification
- Kingdom: Animalia
- Phylum: Arthropoda
- Clade: Pancrustacea
- Class: Insecta
- Order: Lepidoptera
- Family: Tortricidae
- Genus: Eucosma
- Species: E. striatulana

Binomial name
- Eucosma striatulana (Walsingham, 1900)

Synonyms
- Tortrix striatulana Walsingham, 1900

Species of moth

Eucosma striatulana is a species of moth of the family Tortricidae. It is found in China (Hubei) and Japan.
