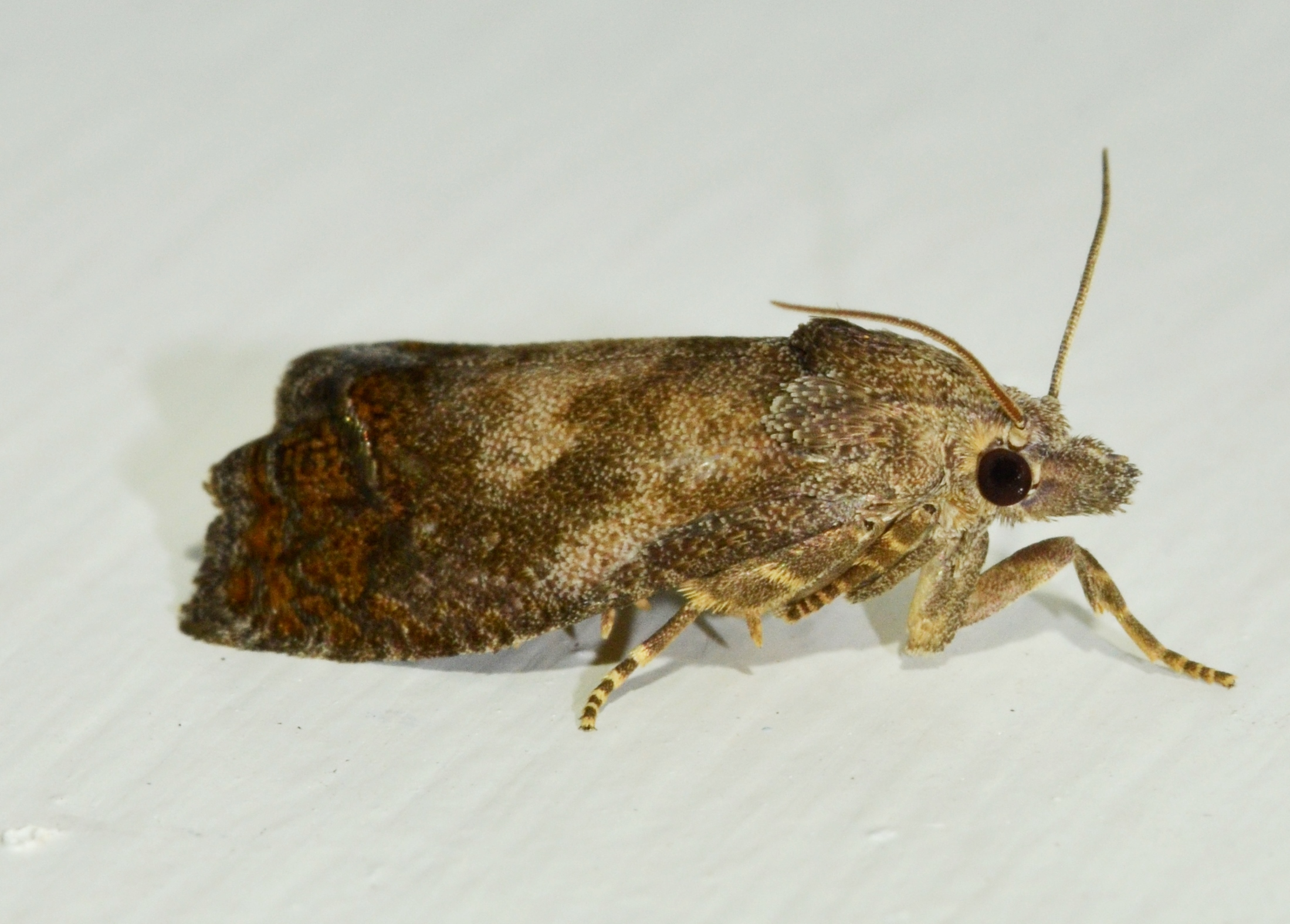

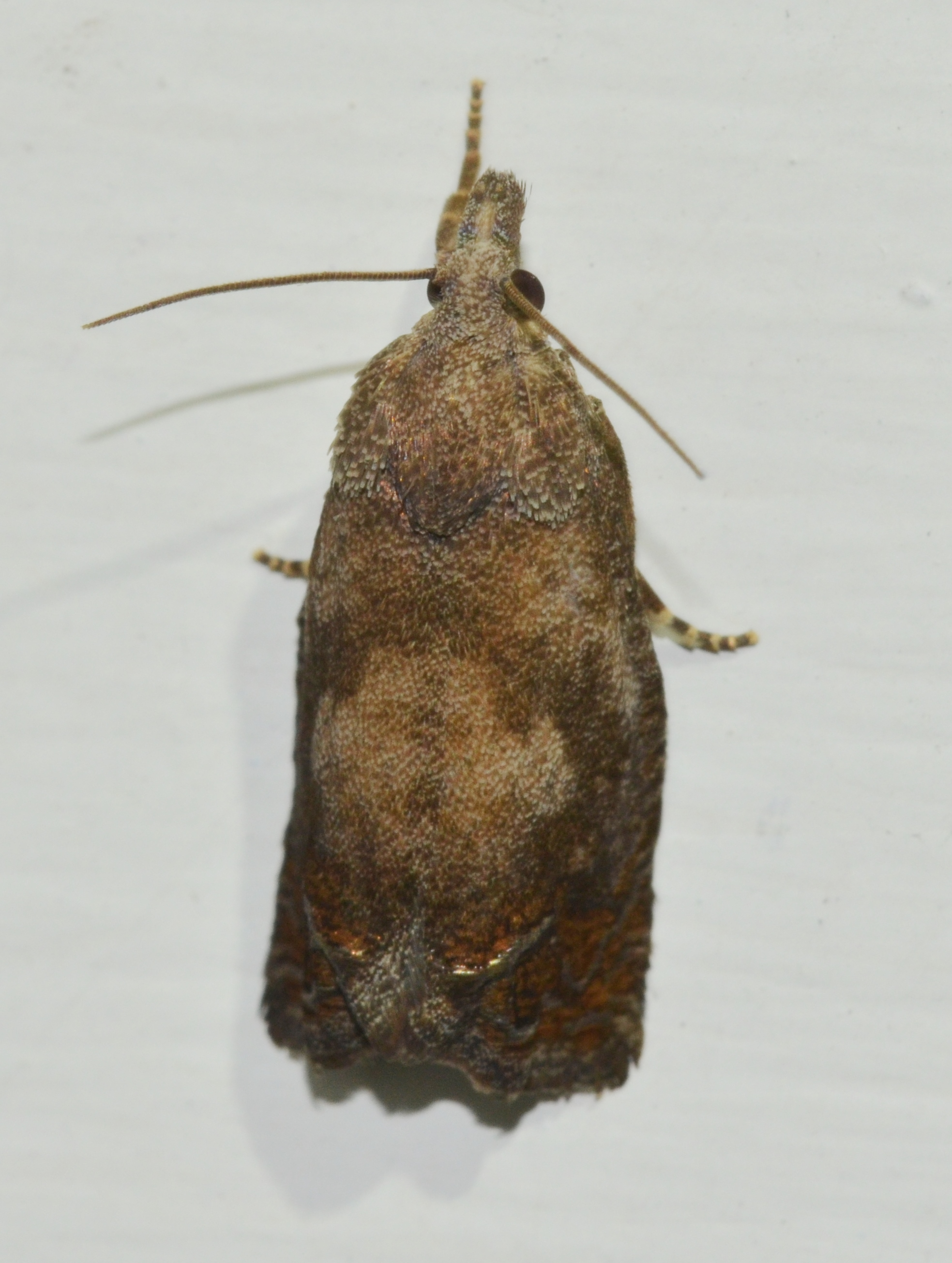

Scientific classification
- Kingdom: Animalia
- Phylum: Arthropoda
- Clade: Pancrustacea
- Class: Insecta
- Order: Lepidoptera
- Family: Tortricidae
- Genus: Eucosma
- Species: E. sombreana

Binomial name
- Eucosma sombreana Kearfott, 1905

Synonyms
- Eucosma phaeodes Meyrick, 1920; Eucosma phlaeodes Heinrich, 1923

= Eucosma sombreana =

Species of moth

Eucosma sombreana is a species of moth of the family Tortricidae. It is found in North America, where it has been recorded from South Carolina and Oklahoma to Iowa, Illinois and Ontario.

The wingspan is 19–25 mm. Adults are on wing from June to October.
