= Bactra blepharopis =

Scientific classification
- Kingdom: Animalia
- Phylum: Arthropoda
- Class: Insecta
- Order: Lepidoptera
- Family: Tortricidae
- Genus: Bactra
- Species: B. blepharopis

Binomial name
- Bactra blepharopis Meyrick, 1911

Synonyms
- Eucosma neurosticha Turner, 1946; Eucosma syntaractis Turner, 1946

Species of moth

Bactra blepharopis is a species of moth of the family Tortricidae. It is found in New Caledonia and Australia, where it has been recorded from New South Wales and Queensland.
