= Eucosma striatiradix =

Scientific classification
- Kingdom: Animalia
- Phylum: Arthropoda
- Clade: Pancrustacea
- Class: Insecta
- Order: Lepidoptera
- Family: Tortricidae
- Genus: Eucosma
- Species: E. striatiradix

Binomial name
- Eucosma striatiradix Kuznetsov, 1964

Synonyms
- Eucosma (Phaneta) striatiradix Kuznetsov, 1964

Species of moth

Eucosma striatiradix is a species of moth of the family Tortricidae. It is found in China (Jilin), Korea, Japan and Russia.
