= Eucosma metana =

Scientific classification
- Kingdom: Animalia
- Phylum: Arthropoda
- Clade: Pancrustacea
- Class: Insecta
- Order: Lepidoptera
- Family: Tortricidae
- Genus: Eucosma
- Species: E. metana

Binomial name
- Eucosma metana (Kennel, 1919)

Synonyms
- Semasia metana Kennel, 1919

Species of moth

Eucosma metana is a species of moth of the family Tortricidae. It is found in Shanghai, China.
