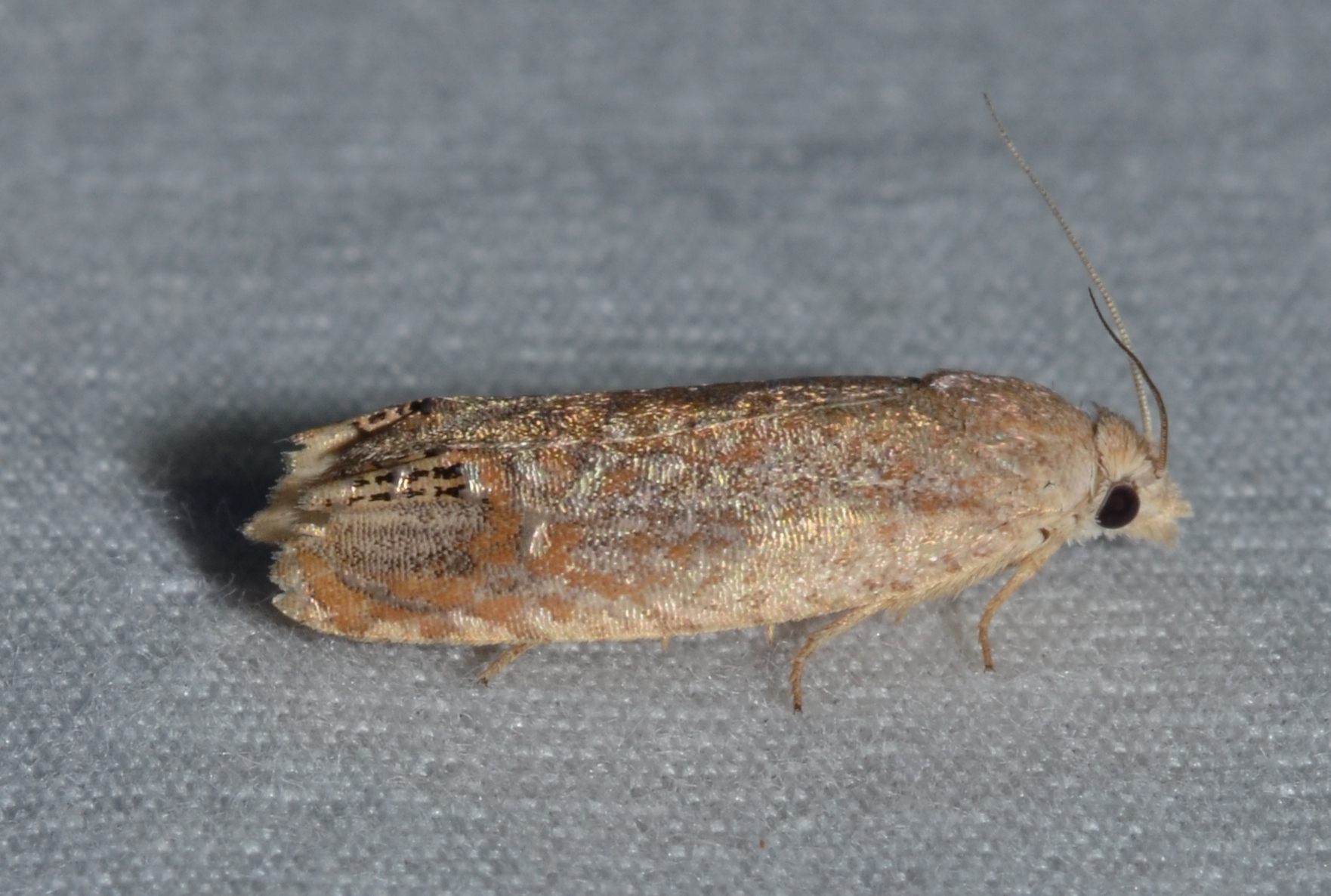

Scientific classification
- Kingdom: Animalia
- Phylum: Arthropoda
- Clade: Pancrustacea
- Class: Insecta
- Order: Lepidoptera
- Family: Tortricidae
- Genus: Eucosma
- Species: E. glomerana

Binomial name
- Eucosma glomerana Walsingham, 1879

= Eucosma glomerana =

Species of moth

Eucosma glomerana is a species of tortricid moth in the family Tortricidae.

The MONA or Hodges number for Eucosma glomerana is 3051.
