= Eucosma capitulata =

Scientific classification
- Kingdom: Animalia
- Phylum: Arthropoda
- Class: Insecta
- Order: Lepidoptera
- Family: Tortricidae
- Genus: Eucosma
- Species: E. capitulata

Binomial name
- Eucosma capitulata Meyrick, 1907

Species of moth

Eucosma capitulata is a moth of the family Tortricidae first described by Edward Meyrick in 1907. It is found in Sri Lanka.
