= Eucosma ocladias =

Scientific classification
- Kingdom: Animalia
- Phylum: Arthropoda
- Class: Insecta
- Order: Lepidoptera
- Family: Tortricidae
- Genus: Eucosma
- Species: E. ocladias

Binomial name
- Eucosma ocladias Meyrick, 1906

Species of moth

Eucosma ocladias is a moth of the family Tortricidae first described by Edward Meyrick in 1906. It is found in Sri Lanka.
