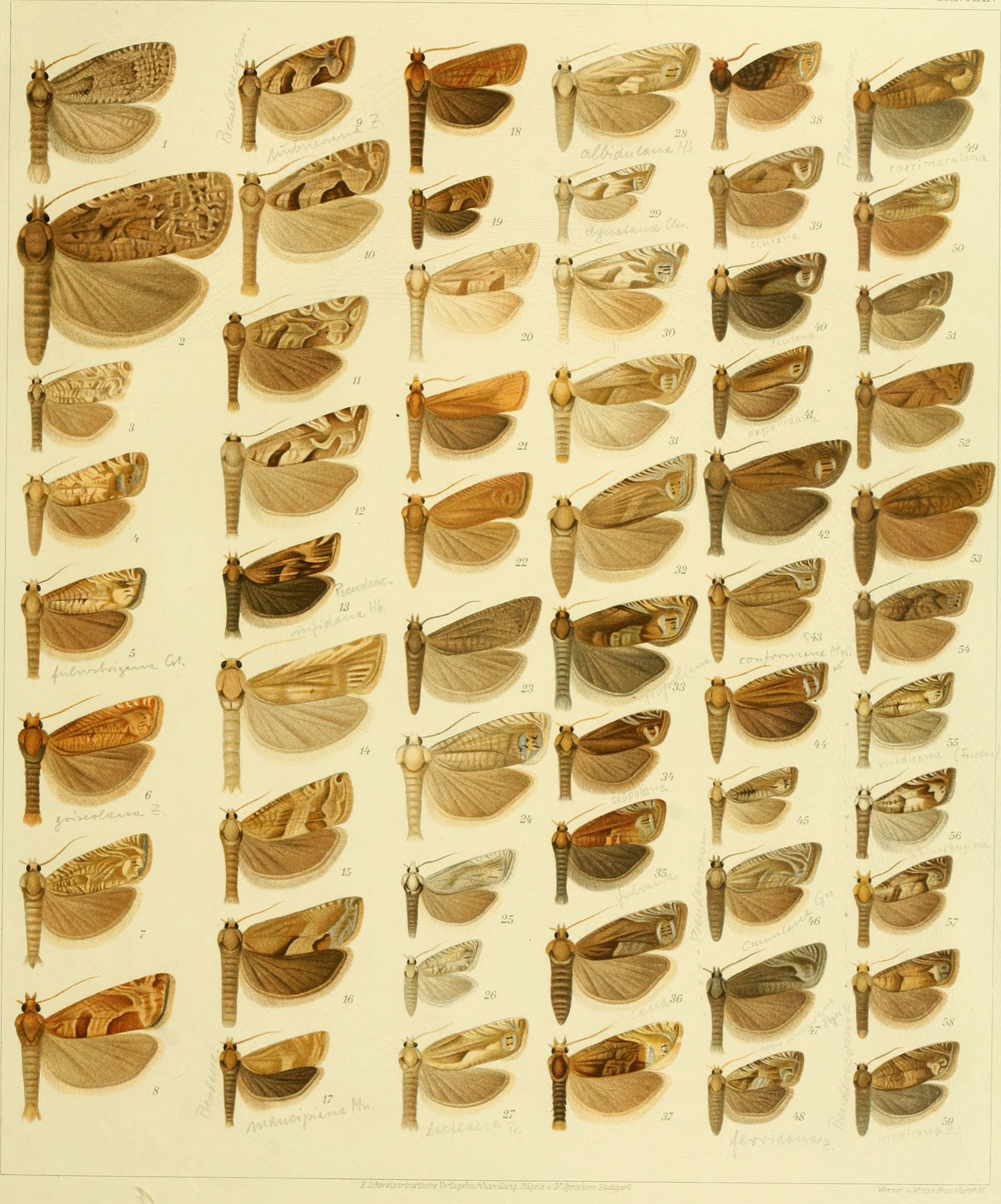
- Eucosma haberhaueri in Kennel Die palaearktischen tortriciden figure 37 male type

Scientific classification
- Kingdom: Animalia
- Phylum: Arthropoda
- Clade: Pancrustacea
- Class: Insecta
- Order: Lepidoptera
- Family: Tortricidae
- Genus: Eucosma
- Species: E. haberhaueri

Binomial name
- Eucosma haberhaueri (Kennel, 1901)

Synonyms
- Epiblema haberhaueri Kennel, 1901

= Eucosma haberhaueri =

Species of moth

Eucosma haberhaueri is a species of moth of the family Tortricidae. It is found in China (Xinjiang), Uzbekistan, Kyrgyzstan and Kazakhstan.
