= Eucosma getonia =

Scientific classification
- Kingdom: Animalia
- Phylum: Arthropoda
- Clade: Pancrustacea
- Class: Insecta
- Order: Lepidoptera
- Family: Tortricidae
- Genus: Eucosma
- Species: E. getonia

Binomial name
- Eucosma getonia Razowski, 1972

Species of moth

Eucosma getonia is a species of moth from the family Tortricidae. It is found in China (Hebei, Inner Mongolia), Mongolia and Russia.
