= Eucosma brachysticta =

Scientific classification
- Kingdom: Animalia
- Phylum: Arthropoda
- Clade: Pancrustacea
- Class: Insecta
- Order: Lepidoptera
- Family: Tortricidae
- Genus: Eucosma
- Species: E. brachysticta

Binomial name
- Eucosma brachysticta Meyrick, 1935

Species of moth

Eucosma brachysticta is a species of moth of the family Tortricidae. It is found in China (Tianjin, Jiangsu, Sichuan, Ningxia) and Japan.
