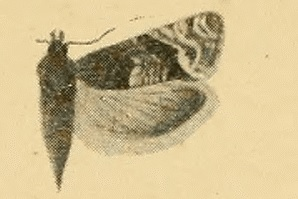

Scientific classification
- Kingdom: Animalia
- Phylum: Arthropoda
- Clade: Pancrustacea
- Class: Insecta
- Order: Lepidoptera
- Family: Tortricidae
- Genus: Eucosma
- Species: E. explicatana

Binomial name
- Eucosma explicatana (Kennel, 1900)

Synonyms
- Steganoptycha explicatana Kennel, 1900

= Eucosma explicatana =

Species of moth

Eucosma explicatana is a species of moth of the family Tortricidae. It is found in China (Tianjin, Hebei, Shanxi, Inner Mongolia, Heilongjiang, Zhejiang, Shaanxi, Ningxia), Mongolia, Russia and Kazakhstan.

The wingspan is 12–16 mm (0.47–0.63 in). Adults are on wing from June to July.

The larvae feed on Hypoestes cumingiana.
