= Eucosma ommatoptera =

Scientific classification
- Kingdom: Animalia
- Phylum: Arthropoda
- Clade: Pancrustacea
- Class: Insecta
- Order: Lepidoptera
- Family: Tortricidae
- Genus: Eucosma
- Species: E. ommatoptera

Binomial name
- Eucosma ommatoptera Falkovitsh, 1965

Synonyms
- Grapholitha opulentana Christoph, 1882

Species of moth

Eucosma ommatoptera is a species of moth of the family Tortricidae. It is found in Japan, China and the Russian Far East.

== Subspecies ==
- Eucosma ommatoptera ommatoptera (Russian Far East)
- Eucosma ommatoptera kurilensis Kuznetzov, 1968 (Kuril Islands, Japan, China: Henan, Yunnan)
