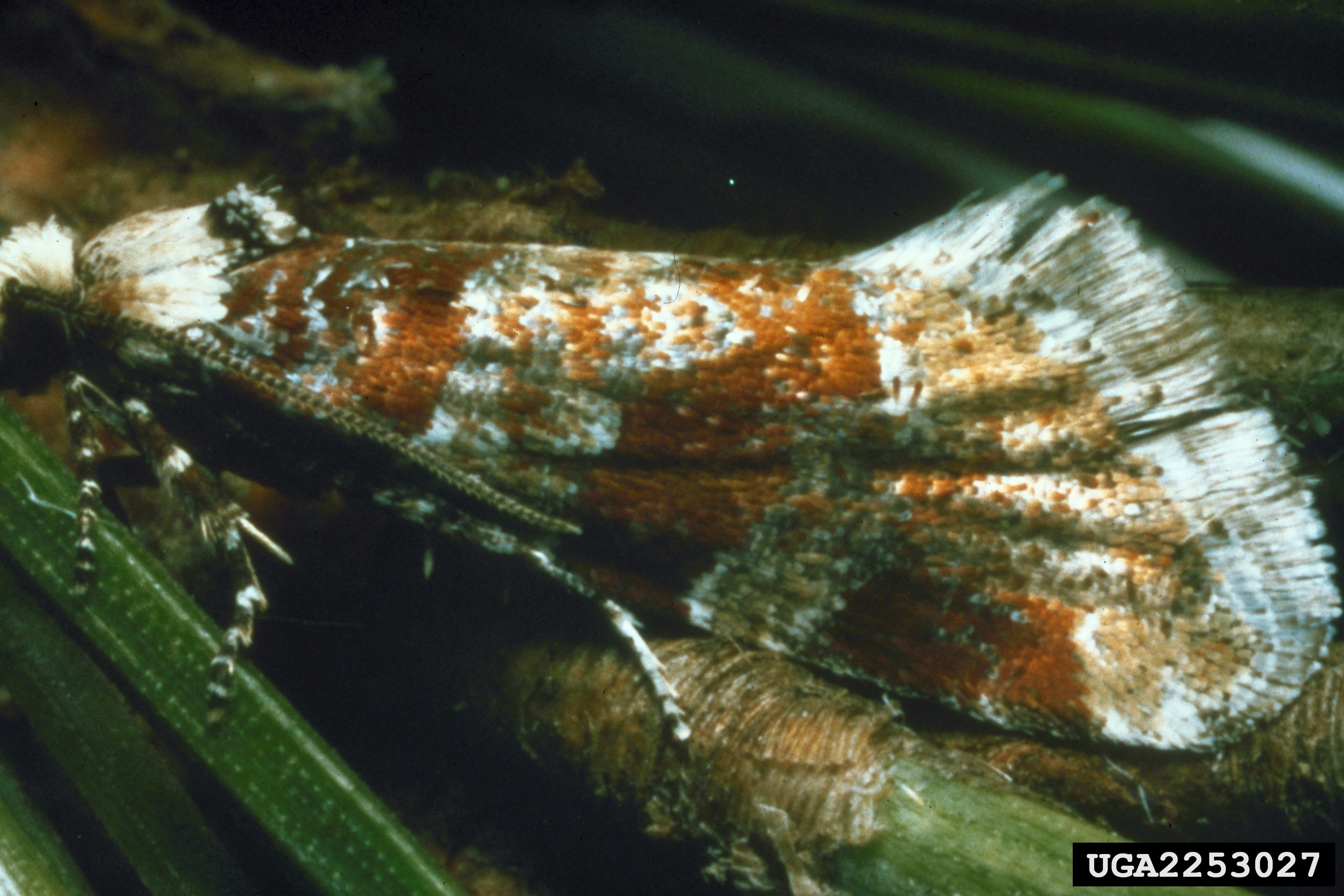

Scientific classification
- Kingdom: Animalia
- Phylum: Arthropoda
- Clade: Pancrustacea
- Class: Insecta
- Order: Lepidoptera
- Family: Tortricidae
- Genus: Eucosma
- Species: E. sonomana

Binomial name
- Eucosma sonomana Kearfott, 1907

= Eucosma sonomana =

Species of moth

Eucosma sonomana, the western pineshoot borer, is a moth of the family Tortricidae. It is found in western North America.

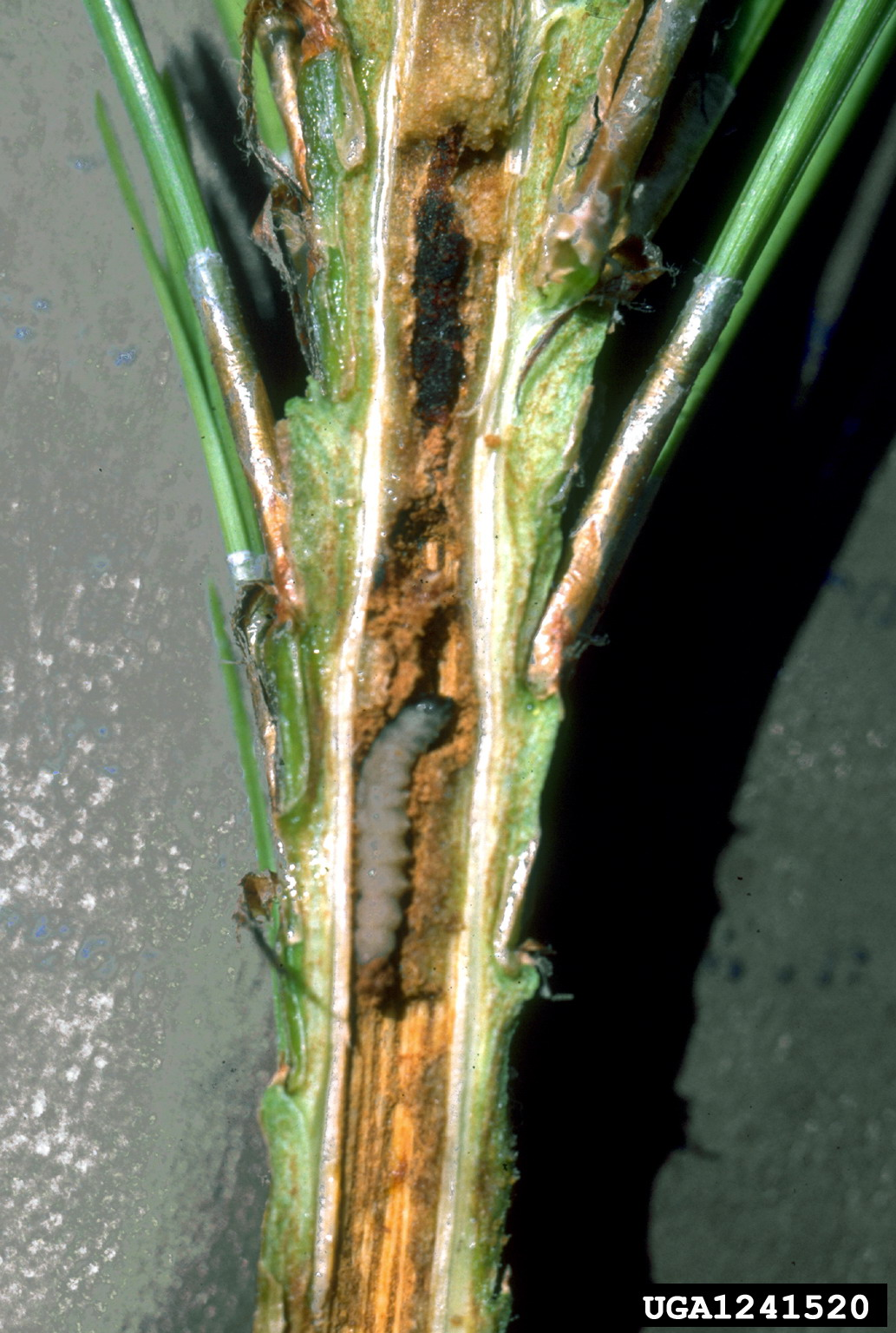
Larva

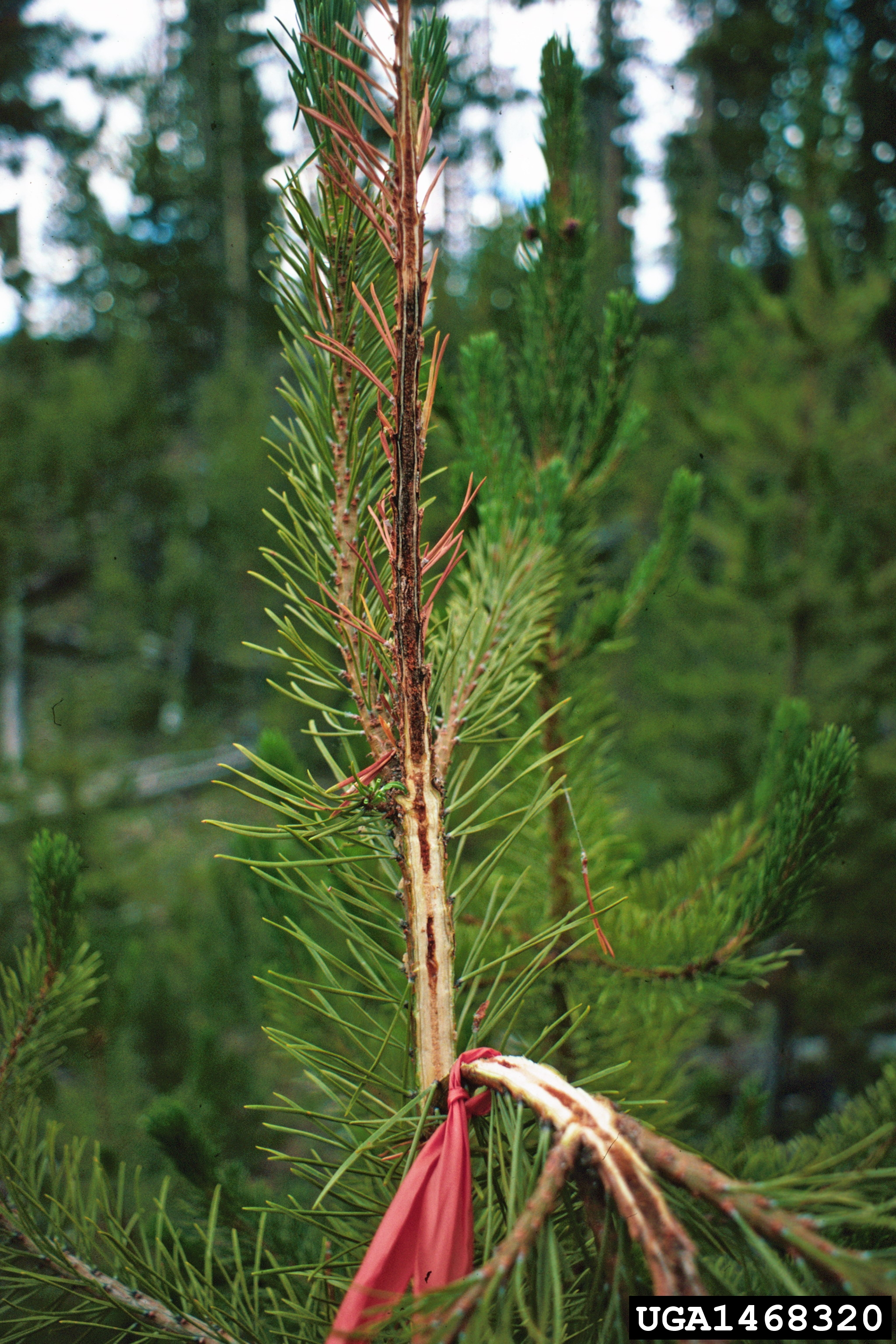
Damage

The wingspan is 16–22 mm. Adults are on wing for two to three months during the spring. There is one generation per year.

Larvae feed on pine species and is considered a pest on Pinus ponderosa. They mine the pith of terminal shoots.
