= Eucosma scutiformis =

Scientific classification
- Kingdom: Animalia
- Phylum: Arthropoda
- Clade: Pancrustacea
- Class: Insecta
- Order: Lepidoptera
- Family: Tortricidae
- Genus: Eucosma
- Species: E. scutiformis

Binomial name
- Eucosma scutiformis Meyrick, 1931

Species of moth

Eucosma scutiformis is a species of moth of the family Tortricidae. It is found in China (Sichuan) and Japan.
