= Eucosma glebana =

Scientific classification
- Kingdom: Animalia
- Phylum: Arthropoda
- Clade: Pancrustacea
- Class: Insecta
- Order: Lepidoptera
- Family: Tortricidae
- Genus: Eucosma
- Species: E. glebana

Binomial name
- Eucosma glebana (Snellen, 1883)

Synonyms
- Grapholitha glebana Snellen, 1883; Thiodia sinensis Walsingham, 1900

Species of moth

Eucosma glebana is a species of moth of the family Tortricidae. It is found in China (Zhejiang, Shaanxi), Korea, Japan and Russia.

The wingspan is 19–21 mm.
