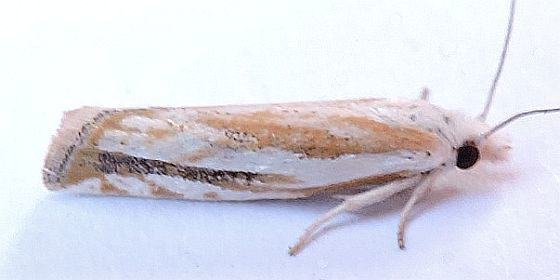

Scientific classification
- Kingdom: Animalia
- Phylum: Arthropoda
- Clade: Pancrustacea
- Class: Insecta
- Order: Lepidoptera
- Family: Tortricidae
- Genus: Eucosma
- Species: E. morrisoni

Binomial name
- Eucosma morrisoni (Walsingham, 1884)

Synonyms
- Paedisca morrisoni Walsingham, 1884; Pelochrista morrisoni

= Eucosma morrisoni =

Morrison's mosaic

Species of moth

Eucosma morrisoni, or Morrison's mosaic, is a species of moth of the family Tortricidae described by Thomas de Grey, 6th Baron Walsingham in 1884. It is found in western states North America and from Washington east to Michigan. The species is listed as threatened in the US state of Connecticut.

The length of the forewings is 7.3–10.5 mm. Adults are on wings from June to August.
