= Eucosma ochricostana =

Scientific classification
- Kingdom: Animalia
- Phylum: Arthropoda
- Clade: Pancrustacea
- Class: Insecta
- Order: Lepidoptera
- Family: Tortricidae
- Genus: Eucosma
- Species: E. ochricostana

Binomial name
- Eucosma ochricostana Razowski, 1972

Species of moth

Eucosma ochricostana is a species of moth of the family Tortricidae, found in Jilin, China.
