= Eucosma magnana =

Scientific classification
- Kingdom: Animalia
- Phylum: Arthropoda
- Clade: Pancrustacea
- Class: Insecta
- Order: Lepidoptera
- Family: Tortricidae
- Genus: Eucosma
- Species: E. magnana

Binomial name
- Eucosma magnana Kuznetzov, 1978

Species of moth

Eucosma magnana is a species of moth of the family Tortricidae. It is found in China (Inner Mongolia), Kyrgyzstan and Vietnam.

The larvae feed on Serratula hirsuta and Serratula tinctoria.
