= Eucosma apocrypha =

Scientific classification
- Kingdom: Animalia
- Phylum: Arthropoda
- Clade: Pancrustacea
- Class: Insecta
- Order: Lepidoptera
- Family: Tortricidae
- Genus: Eucosma
- Species: E. apocrypha

Binomial name
- Eucosma apocrypha Falkovitsh, 1964

Synonyms
- Eucosma (Phaneta) apocrypha Falkovitsh, 1964; Eucosma (Phaneta) apocrypha tagarica Falkovitsh, 1964

Species of moth

Eucosma apocrypha is a species of moth of the family Tortricidae. It is found in China (Inner Mongolia, Sichuan), Mongolia, Russia and Kazakhstan.

The wingspan is 12–16 mm. Adults are on wing from July to August.
