= Eucosma discernata =

Scientific classification
- Kingdom: Animalia
- Phylum: Arthropoda
- Clade: Pancrustacea
- Class: Insecta
- Order: Lepidoptera
- Family: Tortricidae
- Genus: Eucosma
- Species: E. discernata

Binomial name
- Eucosma discernata Kuznetzov, 1966

Species of moth

Eucosma discernata is a species of moth of the family Tortricidae. It is found in north-eastern China, Japan and the Russian Far East.
