= Eucosma essexana =

Scientific classification
- Kingdom: Animalia
- Phylum: Arthropoda
- Clade: Pancrustacea
- Class: Insecta
- Order: Lepidoptera
- Family: Tortricidae
- Genus: Eucosma
- Species: E. essexana

Binomial name
- Eucosma essexana (Kearfott, 1907)

Species of moth

Eucosma essexana, the Essex phaneta moth, is a species of tortricid moth in the family Tortricidae.

The MONA or Hodges number for Eucosma essexana is 2910.
