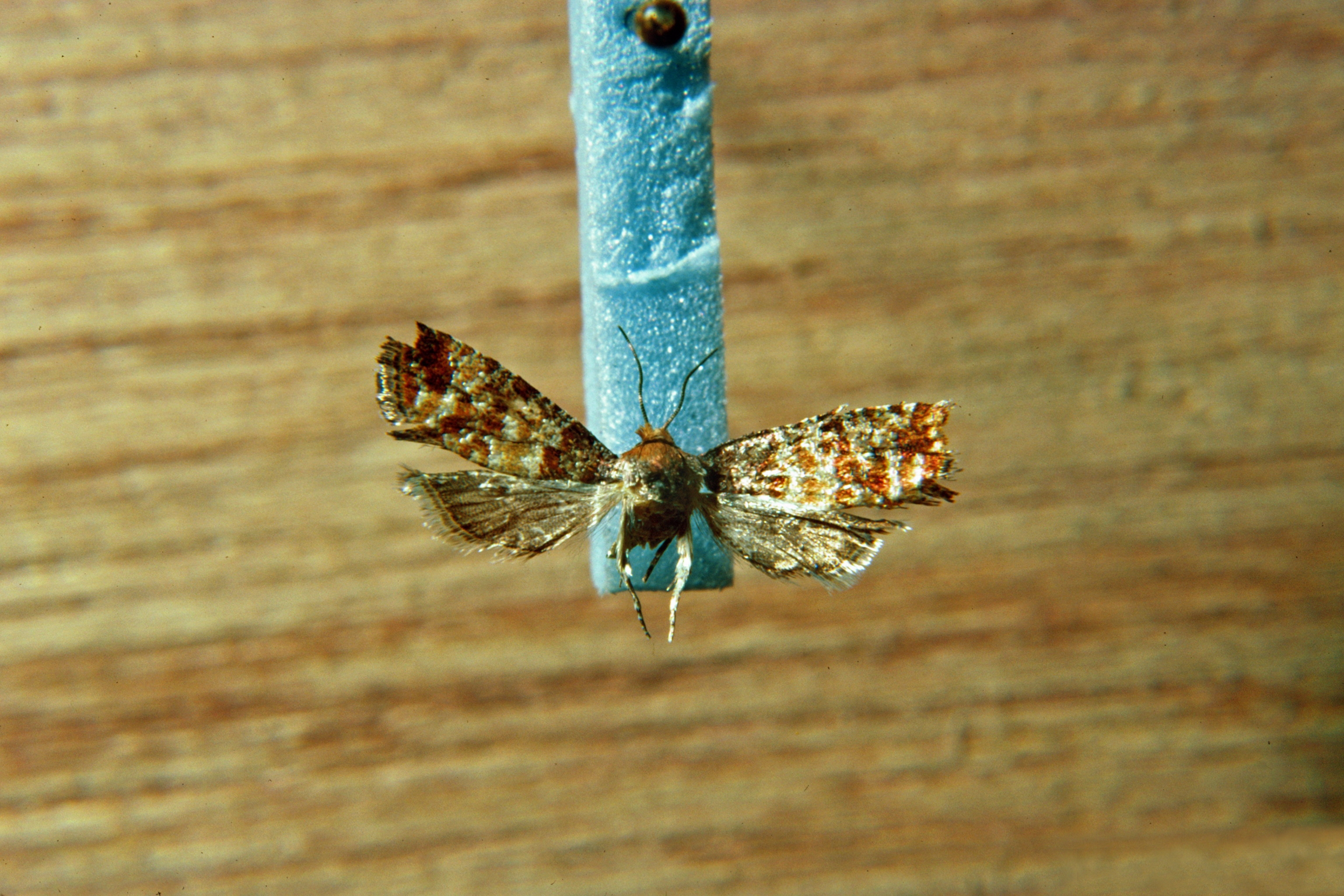

Scientific classification
- Kingdom: Animalia
- Phylum: Arthropoda
- Clade: Pancrustacea
- Class: Insecta
- Order: Lepidoptera
- Family: Tortricidae
- Genus: Eucosma
- Species: E. monitorana

Binomial name
- Eucosma monitorana Heinrich, 1920

= Eucosma monitorana =

Species of moth

Eucosma monitorana, the red pinecone borer moth, is a species of moth of the family Tortricidae. It lives in North America, including Pennsylvania, Ontario, Wisconsin and Maryland.

The wingspan is about 17 mm.

The larvae feed on the conifer cones of Pinus species, including Pinus resinosa, then pupate in the soil.

== Gallery ==
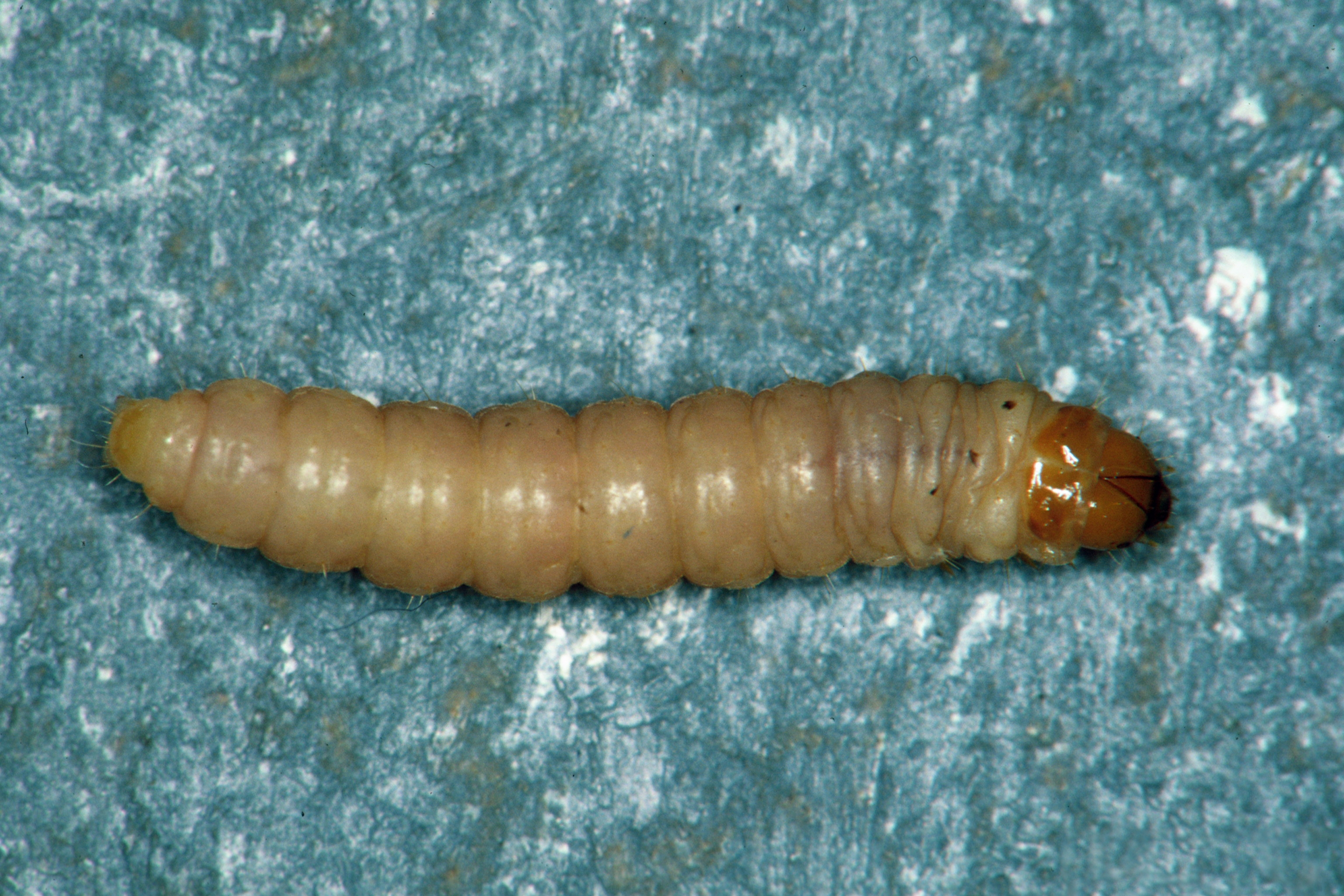
Larva

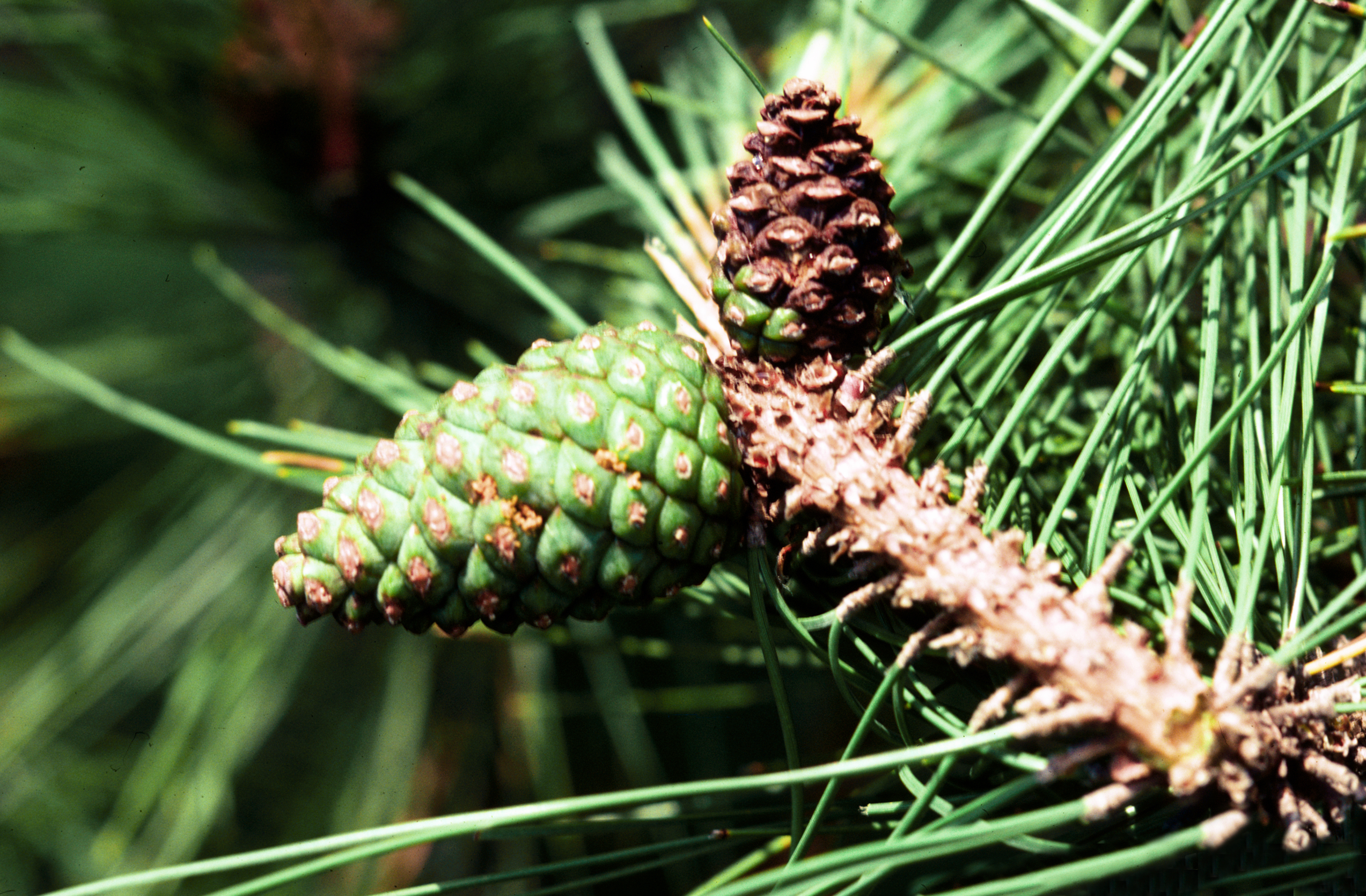
Damage

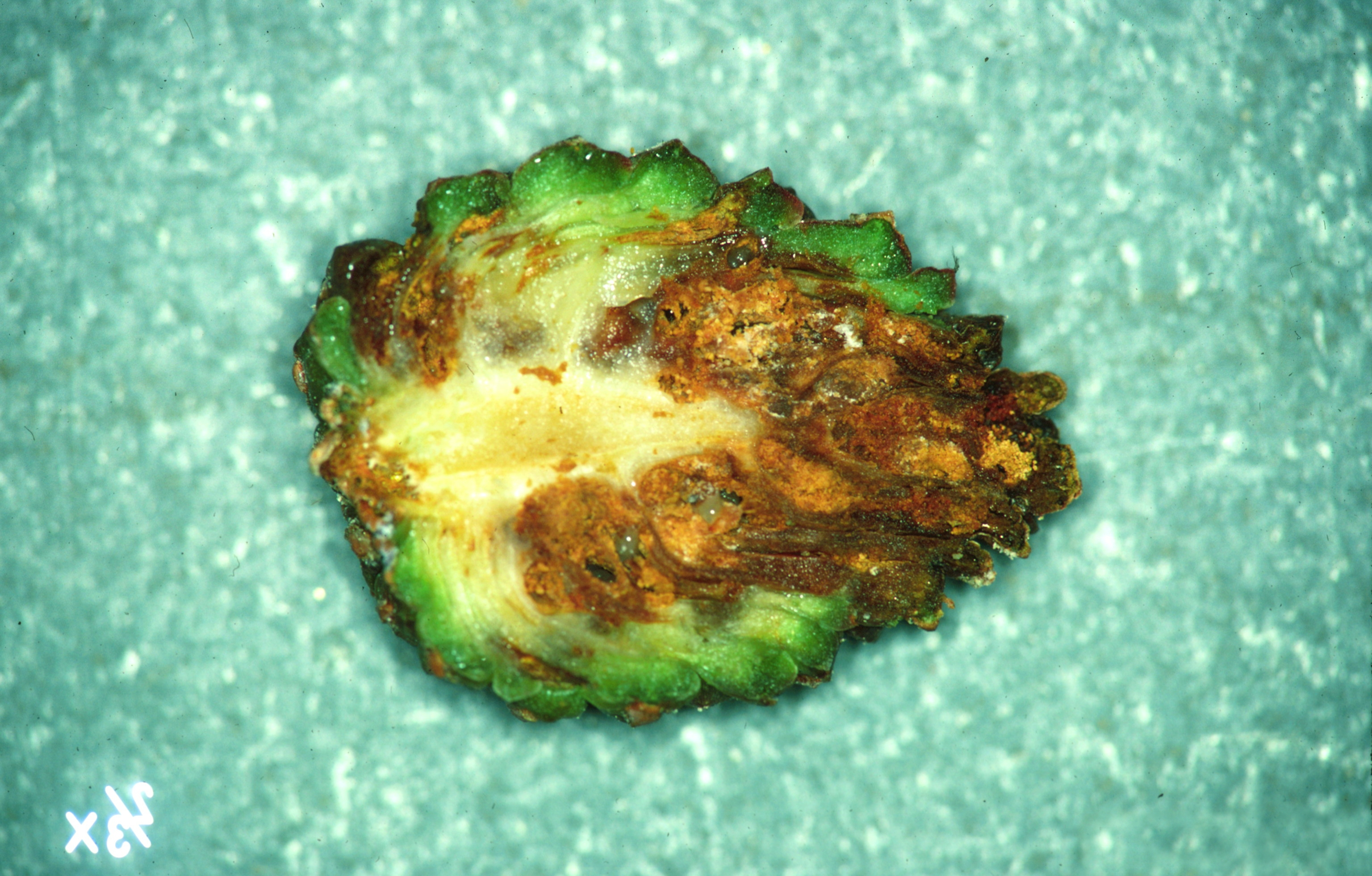
Damage
