= Eucosma ignotana =

Scientific classification
- Kingdom: Animalia
- Phylum: Arthropoda
- Clade: Pancrustacea
- Class: Insecta
- Order: Lepidoptera
- Family: Tortricidae
- Genus: Eucosma
- Species: E. ignotana

Binomial name
- Eucosma ignotana (Caradja, 1916)

Synonyms
- Semasia ignotana Caradja, 1916

Species of moth

Eucosma ignotana is a species of moth of the family Tortricidae. It is found in China (Inner Mongolia, Sichuan, Shaanxi, Qinghai) and Russia.
