= Eucosma hennei =

Scientific classification
- Kingdom: Animalia
- Phylum: Arthropoda
- Clade: Pancrustacea
- Class: Insecta
- Order: Lepidoptera
- Family: Tortricidae
- Genus: Eucosma
- Species: E. hennei

Binomial name
- Eucosma hennei Clarke, 1947

Synonyms
- Pelochrista hennei

Species of moth

Eucosma hennei, or Henne's eucosman moth, is a species of moth of the family Tortricidae. Specimens have been recovered in the El Segundo sand dunes in California The habitat includes open sand, undisturbed sand dunes and dense shrubs populated with the larval host plant Phacelia.
