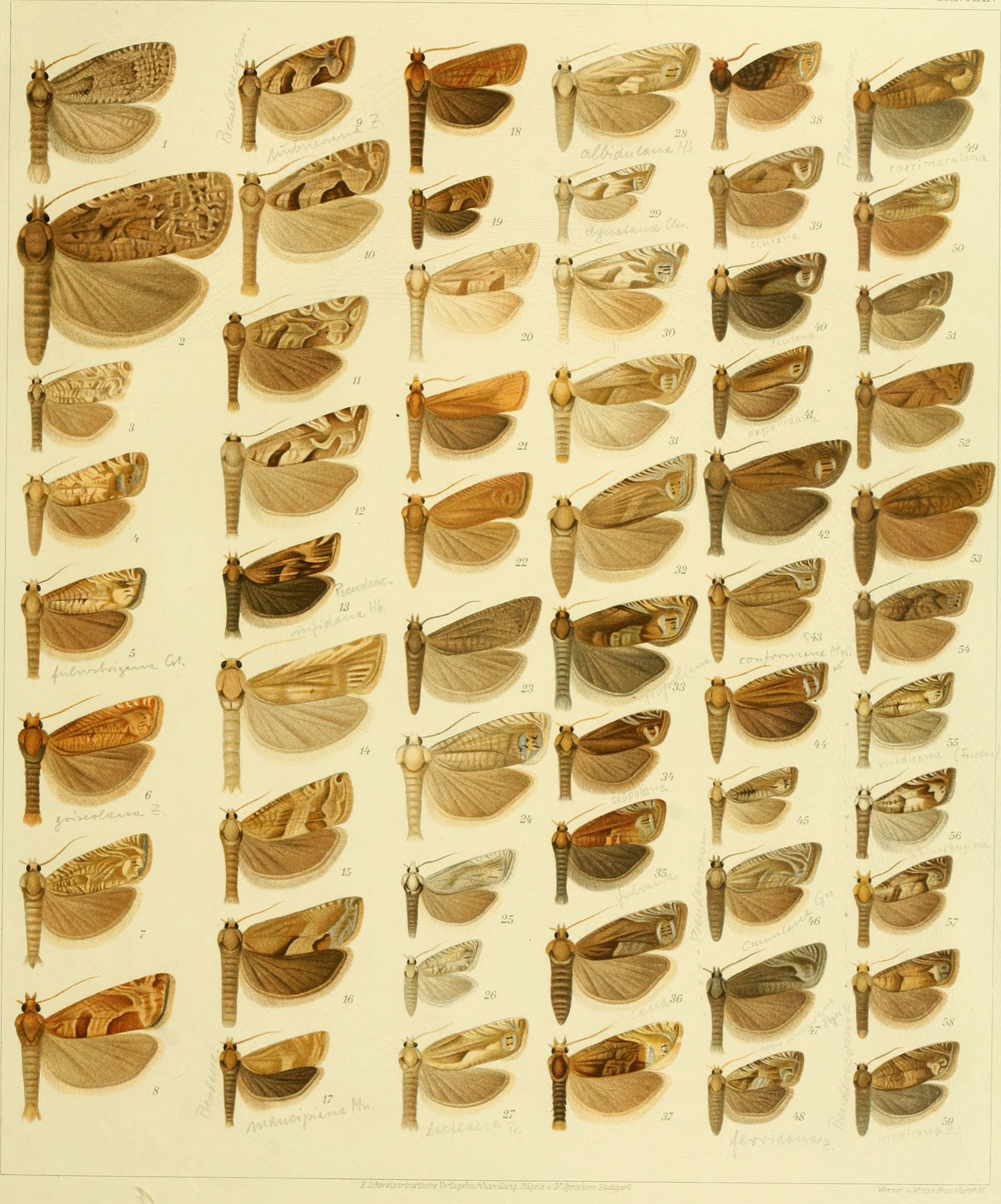
- Eucosma denigratana in Kennel Die palaearktischen tortriciden figure 38 male type

Scientific classification
- Kingdom: Animalia
- Phylum: Arthropoda
- Clade: Pancrustacea
- Class: Insecta
- Order: Lepidoptera
- Family: Tortricidae
- Genus: Eucosma
- Species: E. denigratana

Binomial name
- Eucosma denigratana (Kennel, 1901)

Synonyms
- Epiblema denigratana Kennel, 1901

= Eucosma denigratana =

Species of moth

Eucosma denigratana is a species of moth of the family Tortricidae. It is found in China (Hebei, Heilongjiang), Korea, Japan and Russia.
