= Eucosma ephedrana =

Scientific classification
- Kingdom: Animalia
- Phylum: Arthropoda
- Clade: Pancrustacea
- Class: Insecta
- Order: Lepidoptera
- Family: Tortricidae
- Genus: Eucosma
- Species: E. ephedrana

Binomial name
- Eucosma ephedrana (Christoph, 1877)

Synonyms
- Grapholitha ephedrana Christoph, 1877

Species of moth

Eucosma ephedrana is a species of moth of the family Tortricidae. It is found in Transcaucasia, Central Asia, Iran and Afghanistan.
