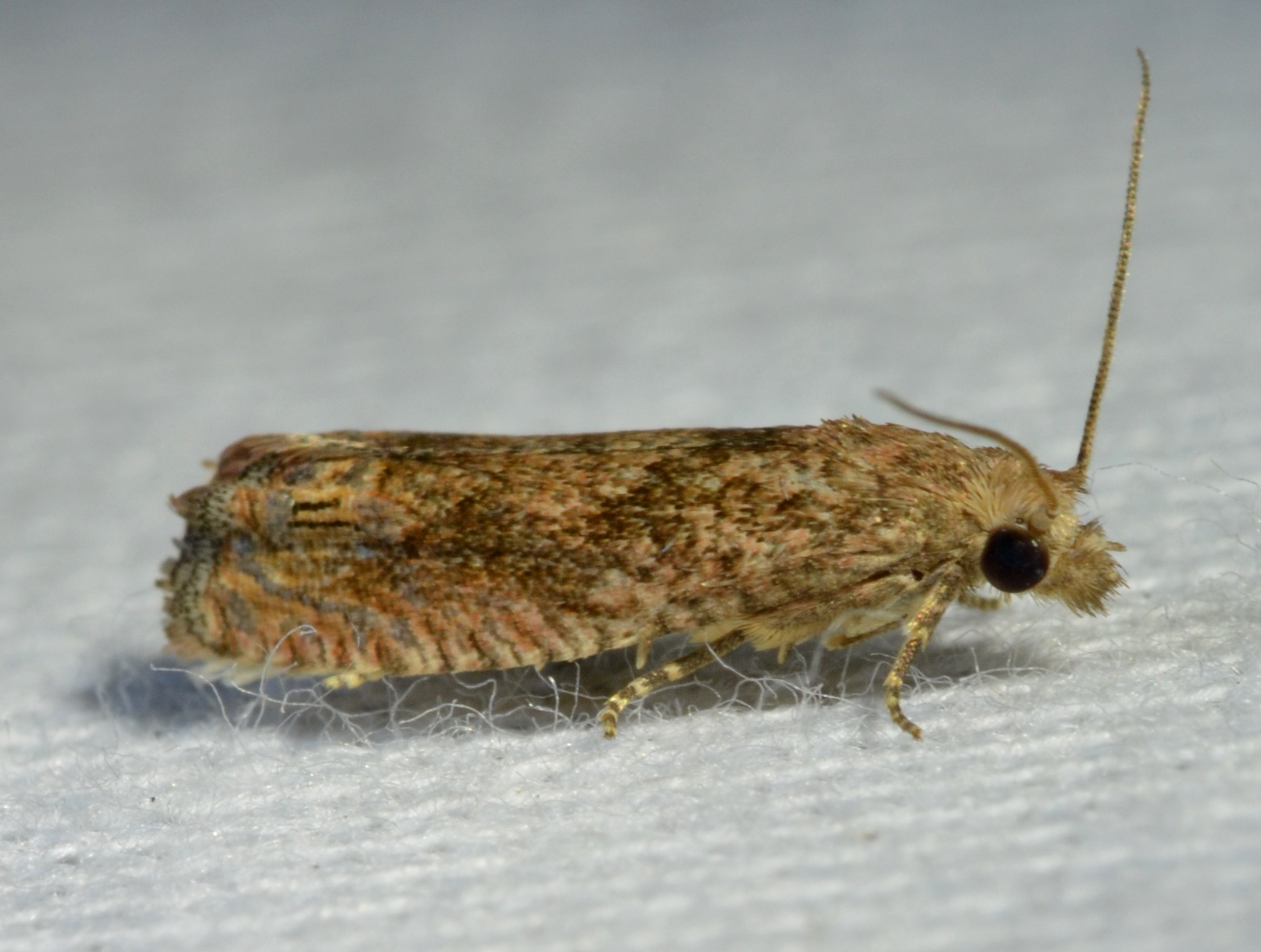

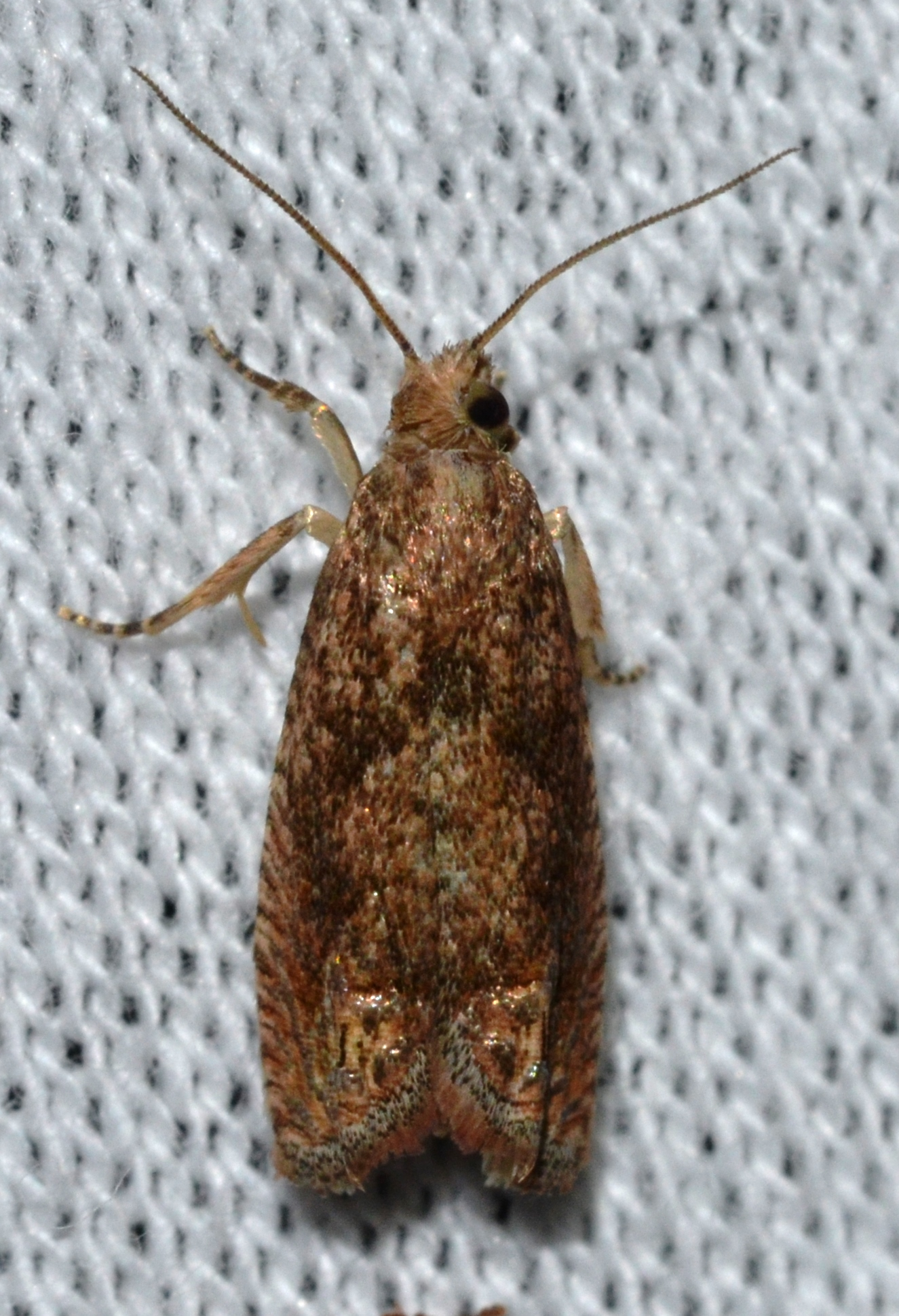

Scientific classification
- Kingdom: Animalia
- Phylum: Arthropoda
- Clade: Pancrustacea
- Class: Insecta
- Order: Lepidoptera
- Family: Tortricidae
- Genus: Eucosma
- Species: E. floridana

Binomial name
- Eucosma floridana Kearfott, 1907

= Eucosma floridana =

Species of moth

Eucosma floridana is a species of moth of the family Tortricidae. It is found in North America, where it has been recorded from Florida, Mississippi and Oklahoma.

The wingspan is about 17 mm. Adults are on wing in July and from September to October.
