= Eucosma abacana =

Scientific classification
- Kingdom: Animalia
- Phylum: Arthropoda
- Clade: Pancrustacea
- Class: Insecta
- Order: Lepidoptera
- Family: Tortricidae
- Genus: Eucosma
- Species: E. abacana

Binomial name
- Eucosma abacana (Erschoff, 1877)

Synonyms
- Grapholitha abacana Erschoff, 1877; Semasia abascana Kurentsov, 1950

Species of moth

Eucosma abacana is a species of moth of the family Tortricidae. It is found in China (Hebei, Inner Mongolia, Jilin, Heilongjiang, Gansu, Qinghai, Ningxia), Mongolia, Japan, Russia and Kazakhstan.

The wingspan is 15–18 mm.

The larvae feed on Artemisia species.
