= Eucosma krygeri =

Scientific classification
- Kingdom: Animalia
- Phylum: Arthropoda
- Clade: Pancrustacea
- Class: Insecta
- Order: Lepidoptera
- Family: Tortricidae
- Genus: Eucosma
- Species: E. krygeri

Binomial name
- Eucosma krygeri (Rebel, 1937)

Species of moth

Eucosma krygeri is a species of moth belonging to the family Tortricidae.

It is native to Denmark.
