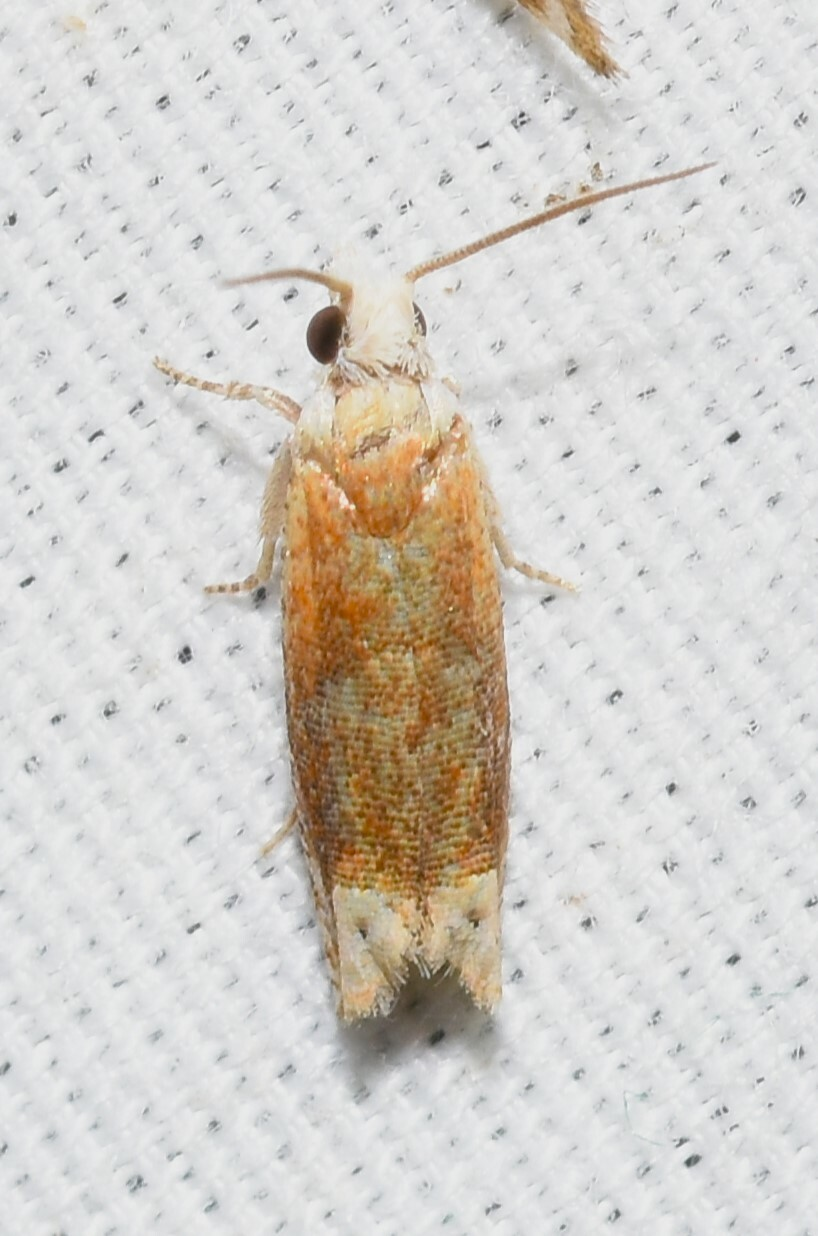

Scientific classification
- Kingdom: Animalia
- Phylum: Arthropoda
- Clade: Pancrustacea
- Class: Insecta
- Order: Lepidoptera
- Family: Tortricidae
- Genus: Eucosma
- Species: E. raracana

Binomial name
- Eucosma raracana (Kearfott, 1907)

Synonyms
- Thiodia raracana Kearfott, 1907; Phaneta raracana (Kearfott, 1907); Thiodia fastidiosa Meyrick, 1912

= Eucosma raracana =

Species of moth

Eucosma raracana, the reddish eucosma, is a species of moth of the family Tortricidae.

== Description ==
Eucosma raracana is native to the eastern United States and Canada. It has a wingspan of 11–14 mm. The head is cream-white with light brown tufts above the eyes. The thorax is a salmon-pink. Eucosma raracana has whitish legs banded with brown and black.
