= Eucosma rigidana =

Scientific classification
- Kingdom: Animalia
- Phylum: Arthropoda
- Clade: Pancrustacea
- Class: Insecta
- Order: Lepidoptera
- Family: Tortricidae
- Genus: Eucosma
- Species: E. rigidana

Binomial name
- Eucosma rigidana (Snellen, 1883)

Synonyms
- Grapholitha (Semasia) rigidana Snellen, 1883; Epiblema subrigidana Caradja, 1916

Species of moth

Eucosma rigidana is a species of moth of the family Tortricidae. It is found in China (Gansu), Korea, Japan and Russia.
