= Eucosma yasudai =

Scientific classification
- Kingdom: Animalia
- Phylum: Arthropoda
- Clade: Pancrustacea
- Class: Insecta
- Order: Lepidoptera
- Family: Tortricidae
- Genus: Eucosma
- Species: E. yasudai

Binomial name
- Eucosma yasudai Nasu, 1982

Species of moth

Eucosma yasudai is a species of moth of the family Tortricidae. It is found in Russia and Japan.

The wingspan is 15–21 mm.

== See also ==
- List of moths of Japan
