= Eucosma symploca =

"Eucosma" symploca

Scientific classification
- Kingdom: Animalia
- Phylum: Arthropoda
- Clade: Pancrustacea
- Class: Insecta
- Order: Lepidoptera
- Family: Tortricidae
- Subfamily: Olethreutinae
- Tribe: Eucosmini
- Genus: incertae sedis
- Species: "E." symploca

Binomial name
- "Eucosma" symploca Turner, 1946

Synonyms
- Ancyclis acrogypsa Turner, 1916; Pseudancylis acrogypsa; Eucosma euprepes Turner, 1946

Species of moth

"Eucosma" symploca is a species of moth of the family Tortricidae. It is found in Australia, where it has been recorded from Queensland.

The wingspan is about 9 mm. The forewings are dark brownish fuscous with a large whitish suffused blotch and three short oblique whitish costal strigulae (fine streaks), as well as some transverse whitish strigulae in the dorsal area. The hindwings are pale grey.
