= Eucosma niveicaput =

Scientific classification
- Kingdom: Animalia
- Phylum: Arthropoda
- Clade: Pancrustacea
- Class: Insecta
- Order: Lepidoptera
- Family: Tortricidae
- Genus: Eucosma
- Species: E. niveicaput

Binomial name
- Eucosma niveicaput (Walsingham, 1900)

Synonyms
- Thiodia niveicaput Walsingham, 1900

Species of moth

Eucosma niveicaput is a species of moth of the family Tortricidae. It is found in China (Shaanxi, Gansu), Japan and the Russian Far East.
