= Holocola obeliscana =

Scientific classification
- Kingdom: Animalia
- Phylum: Arthropoda
- Class: Insecta
- Order: Lepidoptera
- Family: Tortricidae
- Genus: Holocola
- Species: H. obeliscana

Binomial name
- Holocola obeliscana (Meyrick, 1881)

Synonyms
- Strepsiceros obeliscana Meyrick, 1881; Eucosma perfixa Turner, 1916; Spilonota ochronephes Turner, 1946; Spilonota euryptycha Turner, 1946; Eucosma leucopleura Turner, 1946

Species of moth

Holocola obeliscana is a species of moth of the family Tortricidae. It is found in Australia, where it has been recorded from Queensland and New South Wales.

The wingspan is about 14 mm. The forewings are grey whitish with a grey costal fold and dark-fuscous dots on the costa. The hindwings are pale grey.
