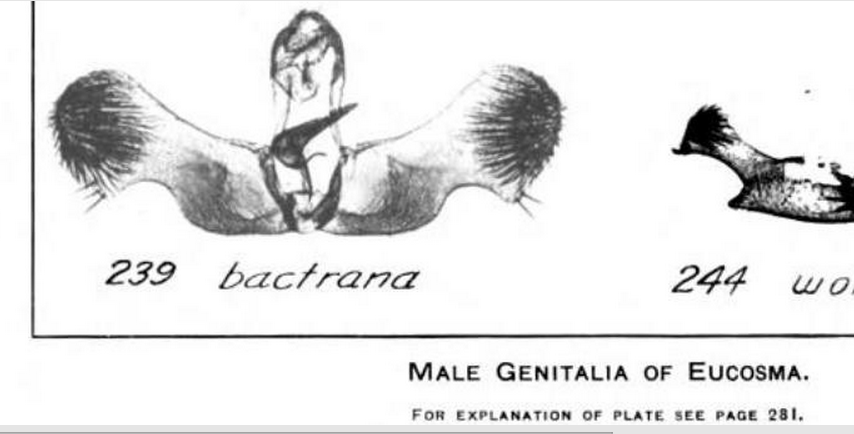
- Eucosma abstemia early sketch of E. bactrana

Scientific classification
- Kingdom: Animalia
- Phylum: Arthropoda
- Clade: Pancrustacea
- Class: Insecta
- Order: Lepidoptera
- Family: Tortricidae
- Genus: Eucosma
- Species: E. abstemia

Binomial name
- Eucosma abstemia Meyrick, 1932

Synonyms
- Pelochrista abstemia; Eucosma bactrana Heinrich, 1923 (preocc. Kennel, 1901)

= Eucosma abstemia =

Species of moth

Eucosma abstemia is a species of moth of the family Tortricidae first described by Edward Meyrick in 1932. It is found in the United States, where it has been recorded from Colorado, Arizona and California.

The wingspan is 26–30 mm. The forewings are grayish white, dusted with ashy-grayish-ocherous and fuscous scales, giving the entire wing an ocherous-gray or pale fuscous-gray appearance. The markings are faint without a distinct basal patch, but in unrubbed specimens a fuscous clouding at the base of the cell. There is an arc of similar but very faint dark shading from the middle of the costa, touching the upper outer angle of the cell and extending to the apex. At the apex, there is a large pale, but distinctly ocherous-fuscous spot. The basal third of the costa is dark fuscous. The hindwings are pale smoky fuscous. Adults have been recorded in July and August.
