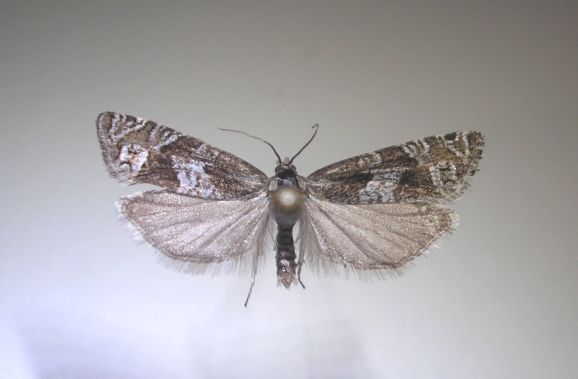

Scientific classification
- Kingdom: Animalia
- Phylum: Arthropoda
- Clade: Pancrustacea
- Class: Insecta
- Order: Lepidoptera
- Family: Tortricidae
- Genus: Eucosma
- Species: E. saussureana

Binomial name
- Eucosma saussureana (Benander, 1928)

Synonyms
- Phaneta saussureana Benander, 1928; Semasia saussureana (Benander, 1928)

= Eucosma saussureana =

Species of moth

Eucosma saussureana is a moth of the family Tortricidae. It is endemic to Fennoscandia.

The wingspan is 18–20 mm. Adults are on wing from June to July.

The larvae feed on Saussurea alpina.
