= List of moths of Russia (Zygaenoidea-Tortricoidea) =

This is a list of the Russian moth species of the superfamilies Zygaenoidea, Sesioidea, Cossoidea and Tortricoidea. It also acts as an index to the species articles and forms part of the full List of moths of Russia.

== Zygaenoidea ==
=== Limacodidae ===
- Apoda limacodes (Hufnagel, 1766)
- Austrapoda dentata (Oberthur, 1879)
- Ceratonema christophi (Graeser, 1888)
- Chibiraga banghaasi (Herring & Happ, 1927)
- Heterogenea asella ([Denis & Schiffermüller], 1775)
- Kitanola sachalinensis Matsumura, 1925
- Kitanola speciosa Inoue, 1956
- Kitanola uncula (Staudinger, 1887)
- Microleon longipalpis Butler, 1885
- Monema flavescens Walker, 1855
- Narosoideus flavidorsalis (Staudinger, 1887)
- Narosoideus fuscicostalis (Fixsen, 1887)
- Neothosea suigensis (Matsumura, 1931)
- Parasa consocia Walker, 1863
- Parasa hilarata (Staudinger, 1887)
- Parasa sinica Moore, 1877
- Phlossa conjuncta (Walker, 1855)
- Phrixolepia sericea Butler, 1877
- Pseudopsyche dembowskii Oberthur, 1879
- Pseudopsyche endoxantha Pungeler, 1914

=== Zygaenidae ===
- Adscita albanica (Naufock, 1926)
- Adscita geryon (Hübner, [1813])
- Adscita obscura (Zeller, 1847)
- Adscita statices (Linnaeus, 1758)
- Amuria cyclops Staudinger, 1887
- Artona funeralis (Butler, 1879)
- Artona gracilis (Walker, 1865)
- Artona octomaculata (Bremer, 1861)
- Elcysma westwoodii (Snellen van Vollenhoven, 1863)
- Illiberis assimilis Jordan, 1907
- Illiberis consimilis Leech, 1898
- Illiberis cybele (Leech, 1889)
- Illiberis hyalina (Staudinger, 1887)
- Illiberis kardakoffi Alberti, 1951
- Illiberis kuprijanovi Efetov, 1995
- Illiberis pruni Dyar, 1905
- Illiberis psychina (Oberthur, 1880)
- Illiberis rotundana Jordan, 1907
- Illiberis tenuis (Butler, 1877)
- Illiberis ulmivora (Graeser, 1888)
- Inope heterogyna Staudinger, 1887
- Inope maerens (Staudinger, 1887)
- Jordanita budensis (Ad. & Aug. Speyer, 1858)
- Jordanita chloros (Hübner, [1813])
- Jordanita globulariae (Hübner, 1793)
- Jordanita graeca (Jordan, 1907)
- Jordanita notata (Zeller, 1847)
- Jordanita paupera (Christoph, 1887)
- Jordanita subsolana (Staudinger, 1862)
- Jordanita volgensis (Moschler, 1862)
- Pryeria sinica Moore, 1877
- Rhagades pruni ([Denis & Schiffermüller], 1775)
- Theresimima ampellophaga (Bayle-Barelle, 1808)
- Zygaena alpherakyi Sheljuzhko, 1936
- Zygaena angelicae Ochsenheimer, 1808
- Zygaena armena Eversmann, 1851
- Zygaena brizae (Esper, 1800)
- Zygaena carniolica (Scopoli, 1763)
- Zygaena centaureae Fischer von Waldheim, 1832
- Zygaena cynarae (Esper, 1789)
- Zygaena dorycnii Ochsenheimer, 1808
- Zygaena ephialtes (Linnaeus, 1767)
- Zygaena exulans (Hohenwarth, 1792)
- Zygaena filipendulae (Linnaeus, 1758)
- Zygaena fraxini Menetries, 1832
- Zygaena haberhaueri Lederer, 1870
- Zygaena laeta (Ht1bner, 1790)
- Zygaena lonicerae (Scheven, 1777)
- Zygaena loti ([Denis & Schiffermüller], 1775)
- Zygaena mana (Kirby, 1892)
- Zygaena minos ([Denis & Schiffermüller], 1775)
- Zygaena nevadensis Rambur, 1858
- Zygaena niphona Butler, 1877
- Zygaena osterodensis Reiss, 1921
- Zygaena punctum Ochsenheimer, 1808
- Zygaena purpuralis (Brunnich, 1763)
- Zygaena sedi Fabricius, 1787
- Zygaena viciae ([Denis & Schiffermüller], 1775)

== Sesioidea ==
=== Brachodidae ===
- Brachodes albina Zagulajev, 1999
- Brachodes appendiculata (Esper, 1783)
- Brachodes dispar (Herrich-Schäffer, 1854)
- Brachodes fulgurita (Fischer von Waldheim, 1832)
- Brachodes pumila (Ochsenheimer, 1808)
- Brachodes pusilla (Eversmann, 1844)
- Brachodes staudingeri Kallies, 1998
- Brachodes straminella (Rebel, 1916)

=== Sesiidae ===
- Bembecia bestianaeli (Capuse, 1973)
- Bembecia daghestanica Gorbunov, 1991
- Bembecia ichneumoniformis ([Denis & Schiffermüller], 1775)
- Bembecia jakuta (Herz, 1903)
- Bembecia megillaeformis (Hübner, [1813])
- Bembecia puella Z.Lastuvka, 1989
- Bembecia sareptana (Bartel, 1912)
- Bembecia scopigera (Scopo1i, 1763)
- Bembecia strandi (W.Kozhantschikov, 1936)
- Bembecia volgensis Gorbunov, 1994
- Chamaesphecia annellata (Zeller, 1847)
- Chamaesphecia astatiformis (Herrich-Schäffer, 1846)
- Chamaesphecia bibioniformis (Esper, 1800)
- Chamaesphecia chalciformis (Esper, 1804)
- Chamaesphecia colpiformis (Staudinger, 1856)
- Chamaesphecia crassicornis Bartel, 1912
- Chamaesphecia djakonovi Popescu-Gorj & Capuse, 1966
- Chamaesphecia dumonti Le Cerf, 1922
- Chamaesphecia empiformis (Esper, 1783)
- Chamaesphecia euceraeformis (Ochsenheimer, 1816)
- Chamaesphecia guriensis (Emich, 1872)
- Chamaesphecia masariformis (Ochsenheimer, 1808)
- Chamaesphecia oxybeliformis (Herrich-Schäffer, 1846)
- Chamaesphecia palustris Kautz, 1927
- Chamaesphecia schmidtiiformis (Freyer, 1836)
- Chamaesphecia tenthrediniformis ([Denis & Schiffermüller], 1775)
- Dipchasphecia altaica Gorbunov, 1991
- Dipchasphecia rhodocnemis Gorbunov, 1991
- Eusphecia pimplaeformis (Oberthur, 1872)
- Microsphecia brosiformis (Hübner, [1813])
- Milisipepsis takizawai (Arita & Spatenka, 1989)
- Negotinthia cingulata (Staudinger, 1871)
- Oligophlebia ulmi (Yang & Wang, 1989)
- Paraglossecia micra Gorbunov, 1988
- Paranthrene diaphana Dalla-Torre & Strand, 1925
- Paranthrene tabaniformis (Rottemburg, 1775)
- Paranthrenopsis editha (Butler, 1878)
- Pennisetia hylaeiformis (Laspeyres, 1801)
- Pennisetia pectinata (Staudinger, 1887)
- Scalarignathia coreacola (Matsumura, 1931)
- Scalarignathia kaszabi Capuse, 1973
- Scalarignathia ussuriensis Gorbunov & Arita, 1995
- Sesia apiformis (Clerck, 1759)
- Sesia bembeciformis (Hübner, [1806])
- Sesia melanocephala Dalman, 1816
- Sesia yezoensis (Hampson, 1919)
- Synansphecia cirgisa (Bartel, 1912)
- Synansphecia muscaeformis (Esper, 1783)
- Synansphecia triannuliformis (Freyer, 1845)
- Synanthedon andrenaeformis (Laspeyres, 1801)
- Synanthedon bicingulata (Staudinger, 1887)
- Synanthedon cephiformis (Ochsenheimer, 1808)
- Synanthedon cerskisi Gorbunov, 1994
- Synanthedon conopiformis (Esper, 1782)
- Synanthedon culiciformis (Linnaeus, 1758)
- Synanthedon flaviventris (Staudinger, 1883)
- Synanthedon formicaeformis (Esper, 1783)
- Synanthedon herzi Spatenka & Gorbunov, 1992
- Synanthedon martjanovi Sheljuzhko, 1918
- Synanthedon mesiaeformis (Herrich-Schäffer, 1846)
- Synanthedon multitarso Spatenka & Arita, 1992
- Synanthedon myopaeformis (Borkhausen, 1789)
- Synanthedon polaris (Staudinger, 1877)
- Synanthedon pseudoscoliaeformis Spatenka & Arita, 1992
- Synanthedon scoliaeformis (Borkhausen, 1789)
- Synanthedon spheciformis ([Denis & Schiffermüller], 1775)
- Synanthedon stomoxiformis (Hübner, 1790)
- Synanthedon tenuis (Butler, 1878)
- Synanthedon tipuliformis (Clerck, 1759)
- Synanthedon ulmicola Yang & Wang, 1989
- Synanthedon uralensis (Bartel, 1906)
- Synanthedon velox (Fixsen, 1887)
- Synanthedon vespiformis (Linnaeus, 1761)
- Synanthedon yanoi Spatenka & Arita, 1992
- Weismanniola agdistiformis (Staudinger, 1866)

== Cossoidea ==
=== Cossidae ===
- Acossus terebra ([Denis & Schiffermüller], 1775)
- Acossus viktor (Yakovlev, 2004)
- Catopta albonubila (Graeser, 1888)
- Catopta perunovi Yakovlev, 2007
- Cossus cossus (Linnaeus, 1758)
- Cossus shmakovi Yakovlev, 2004
- Cossus siniaevi Yakovlev, 2004
- Deserticossus arenicola (Staudinger, 1879)
- Deserticossus campicola (Eversmann, 1854)
- Deserticossus consobrinus (Pungeler, 1898)
- Deserticossus sareptensis (Rothschild, 1912)
- Deserticossus tsingtauana (Bang-Haas, 1912)
- Deserticossus volgensis (Christoph, 1893)
- Dyspessa infuscata (Staudinger, 1892)
- Dyspessa kostjuki Yakovlev, 2005
- Dyspessa pallidata (Staudinger, 1892)
- Dyspessa salicicola (Eversmann, 1848)
- Dyspessa ulula (Borkhausen, 1790)
- Eogystia sibirica (Alphéraky, 1895)
- Kotchevnik durrellii Yakovlev, 2004
- Meharia scythica D.Komarov & Zolotuhin, 2005
- Paracossulus thrips (Hübner, 1818)
- Parahypopta caestrum (Hübner, 1808)
- Phragmataecia albida (Erschoff, 1874)
- Phragmataecia castaneae (Hübner, 1790)
- Phragmataecia pacifica Yakovlev, 2007
- Phragmataecia pygmaea Graeser, 1888
- Streltzoviella insularis (Staudinger, 1892 )
- Stygioides colchica (Herrich-Schäffer, 1851)
- Stygioides tricolor (Lederer, 1858)
- Zeuzera multistrigata Moore, 1881
- Zeuzera pyrina (Linnaeus, 1761)

== Tortricoidea ==
=== Tortricidae ===
- Abrepagoge treitschkeana (Treitschke, 1835)
- Acleris abietana (Hübner, [1822])
- Acleris affinatana (Snellen, 1883)
- Acleris albiscapulana (Christoph, 1881)
- Acleris alnivora Oku, 1956
- Acleris amurensis Caradja, 1928
- Acleris askoldana (Christoph, 1881)
- Acleris aspersana (Hübner, [1817])
- Acleris aurichalcana (Bremer, 1864)
- Acleris bergmanniana (Linnaeus, 1758)
- Acleris caerulescens Walsingham, 1900
- Acleris comariana (Lienig & Zeller, 1846)
- Acleris conchyloides (Walsingham, 1900)
- Acleris crataegi (Kuznetzov, 1964)
- Acleris cribellata Falkovitsh, 1965
- Acleris cristana ([Denis & Schiffermüller], 1775)
- Acleris dealbata (Yasuda, 1975)
- Acleris delicatana (Christoph, 1881)
- Acleris emargana (Fabricius, 1775)
- Acleris enitescens (Meyrick, 1912)
- Acleris expressa Filipjev, 1931
- Acleris exsucana (Kennel, 1901)
- Acleris ferrugana ([Denis & Schiffermüller], 1775)
- Acleris filipjevi Obraztsov, 1956
- Acleris fimbriana (Thunberg, 1791)
- Acleris forsskaleana (Linnaeus, 1758)
- Acleris fuscotogata Walsingham, 1900
- Acleris gobica Kuznetzov, 1975
- Acleris hastiana (Linnaeus, 1758)
- Acleris hippophaeana (Heyden, 1865)
- Acleris hispidana (Christoph, 1881)
- Acleris holmiana (Linnaeus, 1758)
- Acleris hyemana (Haworth, 1811)
- Acleris idonea Razowski, 1972
- Acleris implexana (Walker, 1863)
- Acleris indignana (Christoph, 1881)
- Acleris issikii Oku, 1957
- Acleris kochiella (Goeze, 1783)
- Acleris kuznetsovi Razowski, 1989
- Acleris lacordairana (Duponchel, 1836)
- Acleris laterana (Fabricius, 1794)
- Acleris leechi (Walsingham, 1900)
- Acleris lipsiana ([Denis & Schiffermüller], 1775)
- Acleris literana (Linnaeus, 1758)
- Acleris logiana (Clerck, 1759)
- Acleris longipalpana (Snellen, 1883)
- Acleris lorquiniana (Duponchel, 1835)
- Acleris maccana (Treitschke, 1835)
- Acleris napaea (Meyrick, 1912)
- Acleris nigrilineana Kawabe, 1963
- Acleris nigriradix Filipjev, 1931
- Acleris notana (Donovan, 1806)
- Acleris obtusana (Eversmann, 1844)
- Acleris ochropicta Razowski, 1975
- Acleris paradiseana Walsingham, 1900
- Acleris perfundana Kuzuetzov, 1962
- Acleris permutana (Duponchel, 1836)
- Acleris phalera (Kuznetzov, 1964)
- Acleris platynotana (Walsingham, 1900)
- Acleris proximana Caradja, 1927
- Acleris pulchella Kawabe, 1963
- Acleris quercinana (Zeller, 1849)
- Acleris rhombana ([Denis & Schiffermüller], 1775)
- Acleris roscidana (Hübner, [1799])
- Acleris rubivorella (Filipjev, 1962)
- Acleris rufana ([Denis & Schiffermüller], 1775)
- Acleris salicicola Kuznetzov, 1970
- Acleris scabrana ([Denis & Schiffermüller], 1775)
- Acleris schalleriana (Linnaeus, 1761)
- Acleris shepherdana (Stephens, 1852)
- Acleris similis Filipjev, 1931
- Acleris sparsana ([Denis & Schiffermüller], 1775)
- Acleris stibiana (Snellen, 1883)
- Acleris strigifera Filipjev, 1931
- Acleris submaccana (Filipjev, 1962)
- Acleris tigricolor (Walsingham, 1900)
- Acleris ulmicola (Meyrick, 1930)
- Acleris umbrana (Hübner, [1799])
- Acleris uniformis Filipjev, 1931
- Acleris variegana ([Denis & Schiffermüller], 1775)
- Adoxophyes orana (Fischer von Röslerstamm, 1834)
- Aethes alatavica (Danilevsky, 1962)
- Aethes amurensis Razowski, 1964
- Aethes beatricella (Walsingham, 1898)
- Aethes bilbaensis (Rossler, 1877)
- Aethes caucasica (Amsel, 1959)
- Aethes citreoflava Kumetzov, 1966
- Aethes cnicana (Westwood, 1854)
- Aethes confinis Razowski, 1974
- Aethes decens Razowski, 1970
- Aethes deutschiana (Zetterstedt, 1839)
- Aethes dilucidana (Stephens, 1852)
- Aethes fennicana (Hering, 1924)
- Aethes flagellana (Duponchel, 1836)
- Aethes flava Kumetzov, 1970
- Aethes francillana (Fabricius, 1794)
- Aethes hartmanniana (Clerck, 1759)
- Aethes hoenei Razowski, 1964
- Aethes kindermanniana (Treitschke, 1830)
- Aethes languidana (Mann, 1855)
- Aethes margaritana (Haworth, 1811)
- Aethes margaritifera Falkovitsh, 1963
- Aethes margarotana (Duponchel, 1836)
- Aethes mesomelana (Walker, 1863)
- Aethes moribundana (Staudinger, 1859)
- Aethes nefandana (Kennel, 1899)
- Aethes obscurana (Caradja, 1916)
- Aethes piercei (Obraztsov, 1952)
- Aethes prangana (Kennel, 1900)
- Aethes rectilineana (Caradja, 1939)
- Aethes rubigana (Treitschke, 1830)
- Aethes rutilana (Hübner, [1817])
- Aethes sanguinana (Treitschke, 1830)
- Aethes scalana (Zerny, 1927)
- Aethes smeathmanniana (Fabricius, 1781)
- Aethes tesserana ([Denis & Schiffermüller], 1775)
- Aethes tornella (Walsingham, 1898)
- Aethes triangulana (Treitschke, 1835)
- Aethes williana (Brahm, 1791)
- Aethes xanthina Falkovitsh, 1963
- Agapeta hamana (Linnaeus, 1758)
- Agapeta zoegana (Linnaeus, 1767)
- Aleimma loeflingiana (Linnaeus, 1758)
- Amphicoecia adamana (Kennel, 1919)
- Ancylis achatana ([Denis & Schiffermüller], 1775)
- Ancylis amplimacula Falkovitsh, 1965
- Ancylis angulifasciana Zel1er, 1875
- Ancylis apicella ([Denis & Schiffermüller], 1775)
- Ancylis badiana ([Denis & Schiffermüller], 1775)
- Ancylis bucovinella Peiu & Nemes, 1969
- Ancylis comptana (Frolich, 1828)
- Ancylis corylicolana Kuznetzov, 1962
- Ancylis diminutana (Haworth, 1811)
- Ancylis geminana (Donovan, 1806)
- Ancylis karafutonis Matsumura, 1911
- Ancylis kenneli Kumetzov, 1962
- Ancylis kurentzovi (Kuznetzov, 1969)
- Ancylis laetana (Fabricius, 1775)
- Ancylis loktini (Kuznetzov, 1969)
- Ancylis mandarinana Walsingham, 1900
- Ancylis melanostigma Kuznetzov, 1970
- Ancylis minimana (Caradja, 1916)
- Ancylis mitterbacheriana ([Denis & Schiffermüller], 1775)
- Ancylis myrtiliana (Treitschke, 1830)
- Ancylis nemorana (Kuznetzov, 1969)
- Ancylis obtusana (Haworth, 1811)
- Ancylis paludana (Barrett, 1871)
- Ancylis partitana (Christoph, 1882)
- Ancylis repandana Kennel, 1901
- Ancylis selenana (Guenée, 1845)
- Ancylis subacurana (Douglas, 1847)
- Ancylis tineana (Hübner, [1799])
- Ancylis transientana Filipjev, 1925
- Ancylis uncella ([Denis & Schiffermüller], 1775)
- Ancylis unculana (Haworth, 1811)
- Ancylis unguicella (Linnaeus, 1758)
- Ancylis upupana (Treitschke, 1835)
- Aphelia aglossana (Kennel, 1899)
- Aphelia albociliana (Herrich-Schäffer, 1851)
- Aphelia amplana (Hübner, [1813])
- Aphelia caradjana Caradja, 1916
- Aphelia caucasica Kostjuk, 1975
- Aphelia disjuncta (Filipjev, 1924)
- Aphelia euxina (Djakonov, 1929)
- Aphelia ferugana (Hübner, 1793)
- Aphelia inumbratana (Christoph, 1881)
- Aphelia paleana (Hübner, 1793)
- Aphelia plagiferana (Rebel, 1916)
- Aphelia polyglochina Razowski, 1981
- Aphelia septentrionalis Obraztsov, 1959
- Aphelia stigmatana (Eversmann, 1844)
- Aphelia tshetverikovi Danilevsky, 1963
- Aphelia unitana (Hübner, [1799])
- Aphelia viburnana ([Denis & Schiffermüller], 1775)
- Apotomis algidana Krogerus, 1946
- Apotomis betuletana (Haworth, 1811)
- Apotomis boreana Krogerus, 1946
- Apotomis capreana (Hübner, [1817])
- Apotomis demissana Kennel, 1900
- Apotomis fraterculana Krogerus, 1946
- Apotomis frigidana (Packard, 1867)
- Apotomis infida (Heinrich, 1926)
- Apotomis inundana ([Denis & Schiffermüller], 1775)
- Apotomis lemniscatana (Kennel, 1901)
- Apotomis lineana ([Denis & Schiffermüller], 1775)
- Apotomis lutosana Kennel, 1901
- Apotomis moestana (Wocke, 1862)
- Apotomis monotona Kuznetzov, 1962
- Apotomis sauciana (Frolich, 1828)
- Apotomis semifasciana (Haworth, 1811)
- Apotomis sororculana (Zetterstedt, 1839)
- Apotomis stagnana Kuzuetzov, 1962
- Apotomis turbidana Hübner, [1825]
- Apotomis vaccinii Kuznetzov, 1969
- Apotomis vigens Falkovitsh, 1966
- Archips asiaticus Walsingham, 1900
- Archips audax Razowski, 1977
- Archips betulanus (Hübner, 1787)
- Archips breviplicanus Walsingham, 1900
- Archips capsigeranus (Kennel, 1901)
- Archips crataeganus (Hübner, [1799])
- Archips dichotomus Falkovitsh, 1965
- Archips fumosus Kodama, 1960
- Archips fuscocupreanus Walsingham, 1900
- Archips ingentanus (Christoph, 1881)
- Archips issikii Kodama, 1960
- Archips nigricaudanus (Walsingham, 1900)
- Archips oporanus (Linnaeus, 1758)
- Archips podanus (Scopoli, 1763)
- Archips pulcher (Butler, 1879)
- Archips rosanus (Linnaeus, 1758)
- Archips subrufanus (Snellen, 1883)
- Archips viola Falkovitsh, 1965
- Archips virescana (Clemens, 1865)
- Archips xylosteanus (Linnaeus, 1758)
- Argyroploce aquilonana (Karvonen, 1932)
- Argyroploce arbutella (Linnaeus, 1758)
- Argyroploce concretana (Wocke, 1862)
- Argyroploce exaridana (Kuznetzov, 1991)
- Argyroploce externa (Eversmann, 1844)
- Argyroploce kamtshadala (Falkovitsh, 1966)
- Argyroploce lediana (Linnaeus, 1758)
- Argyroploce magadana (Falkovitsh, 1965)
- Argyroploce mengelana (Femald, 1894)
- Argyroploce noricana (Herrich-Schäffer, 1851)
- Argyroploce roseomaculana (Herrich-Schäffer, 1851)
- Argyrotaenia ljungiana (Thunberg, 1797)
- Asketria kenteana (Staudinger, 1892)
- Asketria kerzhneri Kuznetzov, 1972
- Aterpia andereggana Guenée, 1845
- Aterpia chalybeia Falkovitsh, 1966
- Aterpia circumfluxana (Christoph, 1881)
- Aterpia corticana ([Denis & Schiffermüller], 1775)
- Aterpia flavens Falkovitsh, 1966
- Aterpia flavipunctana (Christoph, 1882)
- Aterpia sieversiana (Nolcken, 1870)
- Bactra bactrana (Kennel, 1901)
- Bactra extrema Diakonoff, 1962
- Bactra festa Diakonoff, 1959
- Bactra furfurana (Haworth, 1811)
- Bactra lacteana Caradja, 1916
- Bactra lancealana (Hübner,[1799])
- Bactra loeligeri Diakonoff, 1956
- Bactra robustana (Christoph, 1872)
- Bactra suedana Bengtsson, 1989
- Barbara fulgens (Kuznetzov, 1969)
- Cacoecimorpha pronubana (Hübner, [1799])
- Capricornia boisduvaliana (Duponchel, 1836)
- Capua vulgana (Frolich, 1828)
- Celypha anatoliana (Caradja, 1916)
- Celypha aurofasciana (Haworth, 1811)
- Celypha cacuminana (Kennel, 1901)
- Celypha capreolana (Herrich-Schäffer, 1851)
- Celypha cespitana (Hübner, [1817])
- Celypha confictana (Kennel, 1901)
- Celypha electana (Kennel, 1901)
- Celypha flavipalpana (Herrich-Schäffer, 1851)
- Celypha fraudulentana (Kennel, 1901)
- Celypha ineptana (Kennel, 1901)
- Celypha kostjukorum Budashkin & Dubatolov, 2006
- Celypha rosaceana (Schlager, 1847)
- Celypha rufana (Scopoli, 1763)
- Celypha rurestrana (Duponchel, 1843)
- Celypha striana ([Denis & Schiffermüller], 1775)
- Celypha tephrea (Falkovitsh, 1966)
- Cerace xanthocosma Diakonoff, 1950
- Ceratoxanthis argentomixtana (Staudinger, 1871)
- Ceratoxanthis externana (Eversmann, 1844)
- Choristoneura albaniana (Walker, 1863)
- Choristoneura diversana (Hübner, [1817])
- Choristoneura evanidana (Kennel, 1901)
- Choristoneura hebenstreitella (Muller, 1764)
- Choristoneura improvisana (Kuznetzov, 1973)
- Choristoneura issikii (Yasuda, 1962)
- Choristoneura lafauryana (Ragonot, 1875)
- Choristoneura longicellana (Walsingham, 1900)
- Choristoneura luticostana (Christoph, 1888)
- Choristoneura murinana (Hübner, [1799])
- Clepsis aerosana (Lederer, 1853)
- Clepsis altaica (Caradja, 1916)
- Clepsis altitudinaria (Filipjev, 1962)
- Clepsis celsana (Kennel, 1919)
- Clepsis chishimana Oku, 1965
- Clepsis consimilana (Hübner, [1817])
- Clepsis crispinana (Kennel, 1919)
- Clepsis danilevskyi Kostjuk, 1973
- Clepsis insignata Oku, 1963
- Clepsis mehli (Opheim, 1964)
- Clepsis moeschleriana (Wocke, 1862)
- Clepsis neglectana (Herrich-Schäffer, 1851)
- Clepsis pallidana (Fabricius, 1776)
- Clepsis phaeana (Rebel, 1916)
- Clepsis plumbeolana (Bremer, 1864)
- Clepsis praeclarana (Kennel, 1899)
- Clepsis rogana (Guenée, 1845)
- Clepsis rolandriana (Linnaeus, 1758)
- Clepsis rurinana (Linnaeus, 1758)
- Clepsis senecionana (Hübner, [1819])
- Clepsis spectrana (Treitschke, 1830)
- Clepsis steineriana (Hübner, [1799])
- Clepsis tannuolana Kostjuk, 1973
- Cnephasia abrasana (Duponchel, 1843)
- Cnephasia alticola Kuznetzov, 1966
- Cnephasia alticolana (Herrich-Schäffer, 1851)
- Cnephasia asseclana ([Denis & Schiffermüller], 1775)
- Cnephasia chrysantheana (Duponchel, 1843)
- Cnephasia communana (Herrich-Schäffer, 1851)
- Cnephasia genitalana Pierce & Metcalfe, 1922
- Cnephasia hellenica Obraztsov, 1956
- Cnephasia heringi Razowski, 1958
- Cnephasia incertana (Treitschke, 1835)
- Cnephasia longana (Haworth, 1811)
- Cnephasia nowickii Razowski, 1958
- Cnephasia orientana (Alphéraky, 1876)
- Cnephasia pasiuana (Hübner, [1799])
- Cnephasia personatana Kennel, 1901
- Cnephasia sedana (Constant, 1884)
- Cnephasia stephensiana (Doubleday, 1849)
- Cnephasia tianshanica Filipjev, 1934
- Cnephasia ussurica Filipjev, 1962
- Coccyx posticana (Zetterstedt, 1839)
- Coccyx tessulatana (Staudinger, 1871)
- Coccyx turionella (Linnaeus, 1758)
- Cochylidia contumescens (Meyrick, 1931)
- Cochylidia heydeniana (Herrich-Schäffer, 1851)
- Cochylidia implicitana (Wocke, 1856)
- Cochylidia moguntiana (Rossler, 1864)
- Cochylidia richteriana (Fischer von Röslerstamm, 1837)
- Cochylidia rupicola (Curtis, 1834)
- Cochylidia subroseana (Haworth, 1811)
- Cochylimorpha alternana (Stephens, 1834)
- Cochylimorpha arenosana Kuznetzov, Jalava & Kullberg, 1998
- Cochylimorpha asiana (Kennel, 1899)
- Cochylimorpha blandana (Eversmann, 1844)
- Cochylimorpha clathrana (Staudinger, 1871)
- Cochylimorpha clathratana (Staudinger, 1879)
- Cochylimorpha cultana (Lederer, 1855)
- Cochylimorpha declivana (Kennel, 1901)
- Cochylimorpha despectana (Kennel, 1899)
- Cochylimorpha discolorana (Kennel, 1899)
- Cochylimorpha discopunctana (Eversmann, 1844)
- Cochylimorpha elongana (Fischer von Röslerstamm, 1839)
- Cochylimorpha fucatana (Snellen, 1883)
- Cochylimorpha fuscimacula (Falkovitsh, 1963)
- Cochylimorpha halophilana (Christoph, 1872)
- Cochylimorpha hedemanniana (Snellen, 1883)
- Cochylimorpha hilarana (Herrich-Schäffer, 1851)
- Cochylimorpha ignicolorana Junnilainen & Nupponen, 2001
- Cochylimorpha jaculana (Snellen, 1883)
- Cochylimorpha jucundana (Treitschke, 1835)
- Cochylimorpha meridiana (Staudinger, 1859)
- Cochylimorpha nodulana (Moschler, 1862)
- Cochylimorpha nomadana (Erschoff, 1874)
- Cochylimorpha obliquana (Eversmann, 1844)
- Cochylimorpha pallens (Kuznetzov, 1966)
- Cochylimorpha perturbatana (Kennel, 1900)
- Cochylimorpha pyramidana (Staudinger, 1871)
- Cochylimorpha straminea (Haworth, 1811)
- Cochylimorpha subwoliniana (Danilevsky, 1962)
- Cochylimorpha triangulifera (Kuznetzov, 1966)
- Cochylimorpha woliniana (Schleich, 1868)
- Cochylis atricapitana (Stephens, 1852)
- Cochylis defessana (Mann, 1861)
- Cochylis discerta Razowski, 1970
- Cochylis dubitana (Hübner, [1799])
- Cochylis epilinana Duponchel, 1842
- Cochylis flaviciliana (Westwood, 1854)
- Cochylis hybridella (Hübner, [1813])
- Cochylis nana (Haworth, 1811)
- Cochylis pallidana Zeller, 1847
- Cochylis posterana Zeller, 1847
- Cochylis roseana (Haworth, 1811)
- Cochylis salebrana (Mann, 1862)
- Coenobiodes abietiella (Matsumura, 1931)
- Crocidosema plebejana Zeller, 1847
- Cryptocochylis conjunctana (Mann, 1864)
- Cydia acerivora (Danilevsky, 1968)
- Cydia amplana (Hübner, [1800])
- Cydia amurensis (Danilevsky, 1968)
- Cydia astragalana (Staudinger, 1871)
- Cydia cognatana (Barrett, 1874)
- Cydia coniferana (Saxesen, 1840)
- Cydia cornucopiae (Tengstrom, 1869)
- Cydia corollana (Hübner, [1823])
- Cydia cosmophorana (Treitschke, 1835)
- Cydia danilevskyi (Kuznetzov, 1973)
- Cydia duplicana (Zetterstedt, 1839)
- Cydia ermolenkoi (Danilevsky, 1968)
- Cydia exquisitana (Rebel, 1889)
- Cydia fagiglandana (Zeller, 1841)
- Cydia glandicolana (Danilevsky, 1968)
- Cydia grunertiana (Ratzeburg, 1868)
- Cydia illustrana (Kuznetzov, 1986)
- Cydia illutana (Herrich-Schäffer, 1851)
- Cydia indivisa (Danilevsky, 1963)
- Cydia informosana (Walker, 1863)
- Cydia inquinatana (Hübner, [1799])
- Cydia intexta (Kuznetzov, 1962)
- Cydia johanssoni Aarvik &, Karsholt, 1993
- Cydia kurilana (Kuznetzov, 1976)
- Cydia laricicolana (Kuznetzov, 1960)
- Cydia leguminana (Lienig & Zeller, 1846)
- Cydia leucogrammana (Hofmann, 1898)
- Cydia maackiana (Danilevsky, 1963)
- Cydia medicaginis (Kumetzov, 1962)
- Cydia microgrammana (Guenée, 1845)
- Cydia milleniana (Adamczewski, 1967)
- Cydia nigricana (Fabricius, 1794)
- Cydia oxytropidis (Martini, 1912)
- Cydia pactolana (Zeller, 1840)
- Cydia perelegans (Kuznetzov, 1962)
- Cydia phalacris (Meyrick, 1912)
- Cydia pomonella (Linnaeus, 1758)
- Cydia populana (Busck, 1916)
- Cydia pyrivora (Danilevsky, 1947)
- Cydia secretana (Kuznetzov, 1973)
- Cydia seductana (Kuznetzov, 1962)
- Cydia servillana (Duponchel, 1836)
- Cydia strobilella (Linnaeus, 1758)
- Cydia succedana ([Denis & Schiffermüller], 1775)
- Cydia trasias (Meyrick, 1928)
- Cydia triangulella (Goeze, 1783)
- Cydia zebeana (Ratzeburg, 1840)
- Cymolomia hartigiana (Saxesen, 1840)
- Cymolomia taigana Falkovitsh, 1966
- Daemilus fulvus (Filipjev, 1962)
- Danilevskia silvana Kuznetzov, 1970
- Dentisociaria armata Kumetzov, 1970
- Diceratura ostrinana (Guenée, 1845)
- Diceratura roseofasciana (Mann, 1855)
- Dichelia histrionana (Frolich, 1828)
- Dichrorampha abhasica Danilevsky, 1968
- Dichrorampha acuminatana (Lienig & Zeller, 1846)
- Dichrorampha aeratana (Pierce & Metcalfe, 1915)
- Dichrorampha agilana (Tengstrom, 1848)
- Dichrorampha alaicana Rebel, 1910
- Dichrorampha albimacula (Danilevsky, 1948)
- Dichrorampha alpigenana (Heinemann, 1863)
- Dichrorampha alpinana (Treitschke, 1830)
- Dichrorampha altaica Danilevsky, 1968
- Dichrorampha ambrosiana (Kennel, 1919)
- Dichrorampha cacaleana (Herrich-Schäffer, 1851)
- Dichrorampha cancellatana Kennel, 1901
- Dichrorampha caucasica (Danilevsky, 1948)
- Dichrorampha cinerascens (Danilevsky, 1948)
- Dichrorampha coniana Obraztsov, 1953
- Dichrorampha consortana (Stephens, 1852)
- Dichrorampha danilevskyi Obraztsov, 1958
- Dichrorampha eximia (Danilevsky, 1948)
- Dichrorampha filipjjevi (Danilevsky, 1948)
- Dichrorampha flavidorsana Knaggs, 1867
- Dichrorampha gruneriana (Herrich-Schäffer, 1851)
- Dichrorampha gueneeana Obraztsov, 1953
- Dichrorampha heegerana (Duponchel, 1843)
- Dichrorampha incognitana (Kremky & Maslowski, 1933)
- Dichrorampha incursana (Herrich-Schäffer, 1851)
- Dichrorampha infuscata (Danilevsky, 1960)
- Dichrorampha insperata (Danilevsky, 1960)
- Dichrorampha interponana (Danilevsky, 1960)
- Dichrorampha klimeschiana Toll, 1955
- Dichrorampha larsana (Danilevsky, 1960)
- Dichrorampha latiflavana Caradja, 1916
- Dichrorampha montanana (Duponchel, 1843)
- Dichrorampha nigrobrunneana (Toll, 1942)
- Dichrorampha obscuratana (Wolff, 1955)
- Dichrorampha okui Komai, 1979
- Dichrorampha petiverella (Linnaeus, 1758)
- Dichrorampha plumbagana (Treitschke, 1830)
- Dichrorampha plumbana (Scopoli, 1763)
- Dichrorampha proxima (Danilevsky, 1948)
- Dichrorampha rjabovi (Danilevsky, 1948)
- Dichrorampha sedatana Busck, 1906
- Dichrorampha sequana (Hübner, [1799])
- Dichrorampha simpliciana (Haworth, 1811)
- Dichrorampha tshetverikovi (Danilevsky, 1960)
- Dichrorampha unicolor (Danilevsky, 1948)
- Dichrorampha uralensis (Danilevsky, 1948)
- Diplocalyptis congruentana (Kennel, 1901)
- Doloploca buraetica Staudinger, 1892
- Doloploca praeviella (Erschoff, 1877)
- Doloploca punctulana ([Denis & Schiffermüller], 1775)
- Eana agricolana (Kennel, 1919)
- Eana andreana (Kennel, 1919)
- Eana argentana (Clerck, 1759)
- Eana canescana (Guenée, 1845)
- Eana characterana (Snellen, 1883)
- Eana derivana (La Harpe, 1858)
- Eana incanana (Stephens, 1852)
- Eana osseana (Scopoli, 1763)
- Eana penziana (Thunberg, 1791)
- Eana vetulana (Christoph, 1881)
- Enarmonia formosana (Scopoli, 1763)
- Enarmonia minuscula Kuznetzov, 1981
- Enarmonodes aino Kuznetzov, 1968
- Enarmonodes kunashirica (Kuznetzov, 1969)
- Enarmonodes recreantana (Kennel, 1900)
- Enarmonopsis major (Walsingham, 1900)
- Endothenia atrata (Caradja, 1926)
- Endothenia austerana (Kennel, 1916)
- Endothenia designata Kuznetzov, 1970
- Endothenia ericetana (Humphreys & Westwood, 1845)
- Endothenia furvida Falkovitsh, 1970
- Endothenia gentianaeana (Hübner, [1799])
- Endothenia hebesana (Walker, 1863)
- Endothenia informalis (Meyrick, 1935)
- Endothenia ingrata Falkovitsh, 1970
- Endothenia kostjuki Kuznetzov, 1993
- Endothenia lapideana (Herrich-Schäffer, 1851)
- Endothenia limata Falkovitsh, 1962
- Endothenia marginana (Haworth, 1811)
- Endothenia menthivora (Oku, 1963)
- Endothenia nigricostana (Haworth, 1811)
- Endothenia oblongana (Haworth, 1811)
- Endothenia pullana (Haworth, 1811)
- Endothenia quadrimaculana (Haworth, 1811)
- Endothenia remigera Falkovitsh, 1970
- Endothenia sororiana (Herrich-Schäffer, 1850)
- Endothenia ustulana (Haworth, 1811)
- Endothenia villosula Falkovitsh, 1966
- Epagoge grotiana (Fabricius, 1781)
- Epibactra immundana (Eversmann, 1844)
- Epiblema acceptana (Snellen, 1883)
- Epiblema angulatana Kennel, 1901
- Epiblema autolitha (Meyrick, 1931)
- Epiblema banghaasi Kennel, 1901
- Epiblema cirsiana (Zeller, 1843)
- Epiblema confusana (Herrich-Schäffer, 1851)
- Epiblema costipunctana (Haworth, 1811)
- Epiblema ermolenkoi Kuznetzov, 1968
- Epiblema expressana (Christoph, 1882)
- Epiblema foenella (Linnaeus, 1758)
- Epiblema grandaevana (Lienig & Zeller, 1846)
- Epiblema graphana (Treitschke, 1835)
- Epiblema hepaticana (Treitschke, 1835)
- Epiblema inconspicua (Walsingham, 1900)
- Epiblema junctana (Herrich-Schäffer, 1856)
- Epiblema kostjuki Kuznetzov, 1973
- Epiblema obscurana (Herrich-Schäffer, 1851)
- Epiblema otiosana (Clemens, 1860)
- Epiblema pryerana (Walsingham, 1900)
- Epiblema quinquefasciana (Matsumura, 1900)
- Epiblema rimosana (Christoph, 1882)
- Epiblema sarmatana (Christoph, 1872)
- Epiblema scutulana ([Denis & Schiffermüller], 1775)
- Epiblema similana ([Denis & Schiffermüller], 1775)
- Epiblema simploniana (Duponchel, 1835)
- Epiblema sticticana (Fabricius, 1794)
- Epiblema turbidana (Treitschke, 1835)
- Epinotia abbreviana (Fabncius, 1794)
- Epinotia aciculana Falkovitsh, 1965
- Epinotia albiguttata (Oku, 1974)
- Epinotia aquila Kuznetzov, 1968
- Epinotia autonoma Falkovitsh, 1965
- Epinotia bicolor (Walsingham, 1900)
- Epinotia bilunana (Haworth, 1811)
- Epinotia brunnichiana (Linnaeus, 1767)
- Epinotia caprana (Fabricius, 1798)
- Epinotia cinereana (Haworth, 1811)
- Epinotia contrariana (Christoph, 1882)
- Epinotia coryli Kuznetzov, 1970
- Epinotia crenana (Hübner, [1799])
- Epinotia cruciana (Linnaeus, 1761)
- Epinotia dalmatana (Rebel, 1891)
- Epinotia demarniana (Fischer von Röslerstamm, 1840)
- Epinotia densiuncaria Kuznetzov, 1985
- Epinotia exquisitana (Christoph, 1882)
- Epinotia festivana (Hübner, [1799])
- Epinotia fraternana (Haworth, 1811)
- Epinotia gimmerthaliana (Lienig & Zeller, 1846)
- Epinotia granitana (Herrich-Schäffer, 1851)
- Epinotia immundana (Fischer von Röslerstamm, 1839)
- Epinotia indecorana (Zetterstedt, 1839)
- Epinotia kochiana (Herrich-Schäffer, 1851)
- Epinotia maculana (Fabricius, 1775)
- Epinotia majorana (Caradja, 1916)
- Epinotia medioplagata (Walsingham, 1895)
- Epinotia mercuriana (Frolich, 1828)
- Epinotia nanana (Treitschke, 1835)
- Epinotia nemorivaga (Tengstrom, 1848)
- Epinotia nigricana (Herrich-Schäffer, 1851)
- Epinotia nisella (Clerck, 1759)
- Epinotia notoceliana Kuznetzov, 1985
- Epinotia parki Bae, 1997
- Epinotia pentagonana (Kennel, 1901)
- Epinotia piceae Issiki, 1961
- Epinotia piceicola Kuznetzov, 1970
- Epinotia pinicola (Kuznetzov, 1969)
- Epinotia pusillana (Peyerimhoff, 1863)
- Epinotia pygmaeana (Hübner, [1799])
- Epinotia ramella (Linnaeus, 1758)
- Epinotia rasdolnyana (Christoph, 1882)
- Epinotia rubiginosana (Herrich-Schäffer, 1851)
- Epinotia rubricana Kuznetzov, 1968
- Epinotia salicicolana Kuznetzov, 1968
- Epinotia signatana (Douglas, 1845)
- Epinotia solandriana (Linnaeus, 1758)
- Epinotia sordidana (Hübner, [1824])
- Epinotia subocellana (Donovan, 1806)
- Epinotia subuculana (Rebel, 1903)
- Epinotia tedella (Clerck, 1759)
- Epinotia tenerana ([Denis & Schiffermüller], 1775)
- Epinotia tetraquetrana (Haworth, 1811)
- Epinotia thapsiana (Zeller, 1847)
- Epinotia trigonella (Linnaeus, 1758)
- Epinotia ulmi Kuznetzov, 1966
- Epinotia ulmicola Kuznetzov, 1966
- Epinotia unisignana Kuznetzov, 1962
- Eriopsela daniilevskyi Kuznetzov, 1972
- Eriopsela falkovitshi Kostjuk, 1979
- Eriopsela mongunana Kostjuk, 1973
- Eriopsela quadrana (Hübner, [1813])
- Eriopsela rosinana (Kennel, 1918)
- Eucoenogenes teliferana (Christoph, 1882)
- Eucosma abacana (Erscho ff, 1877)
- Eucosma aemulana (Schlager, 1849)
- Eucosma agnatana (Christoph, 1872)
- Eucosma albidulana (Herrich-Schäffer, 1851)
- Eucosma apocrypha Falkovitsh, 1964
- Eucosma argentifera Razowski, 1972
- Eucosma aspidiscana (Htibner, [1817])
- Eucosma aurantiradix Kuznetzov, 1962
- Eucosma balatonana (Osthelder, 1937)
- Eucosma brigittana (Kennel, 1919)
- Eucosma campoliliana ([Denis & Schiffermüller], 1775)
- Eucosma cana (Haworth, 1811)
- Eucosma catharaspis (Meyrick, 1931)
- Eucosma catoptrana (Rebel, 1903)
- Eucosma certana Kumetzov, 1967
- Eucosma chrysyphis Razowski, 1972
- Eucosma clarescens Kumetzov, 1964
- Eucosma coagulana (Kennel, 1901)
- Eucosma conformana (Mann, 1872)
- Eucosma confunda Kumetzov, 1966
- Eucosma conterminana (Guenée, 1845)
- Eucosma cumulana (Guenée, 1845)
- Eucosma denigratana (Kennel, 1901)
- Eucosma discernata Kumetzov, 1966
- Eucosma explicatana (Kennel, 1900)
- Eucosma fervidana (Zel1er, 1847)
- Eucosma flavispecula Kumetzov, 1964
- Eucosma fuscida Kumetzov, 1966
- Eucosma getonia Razowski, 1972
- Eucosma glebana (Snellen, 1883)
- Eucosma gorodkovi Kumetzov, 1979
- Eucosma gracilis (Filipjev, 1924)
- Eucosma gradensis (Galvagni, 1909)
- Eucosma guentheri (Tengstrom, 1869)
- Eucosma hohenwartiana ([Denis & Schiffermüller], 1775)
- Eucosma ignotana (Caradja, 1916)
- Eucosma intermediana (Kennel, 1900)
- Eucosma jaceana (Herrich-Schäffer, 1851)
- Eucosma krygeri (Rebel, 1937)
- Eucosma lacteana (Treitschke, 1835)
- Eucosma lignana (Snellen, 1883)
- Eucosma luciana (Kennel, 1919)
- Eucosma lugubrana (Treitschke, 1830)
- Eucosma lyrana (Snellen, 1883)
- Eucosma messingiana (Fischer von Röslerstamm, 1837)
- Eucosma metzneriana (Treitschke, 1830)
- Eucosma monstratana (Rebel, 1906)
- Eucosma muguraxana Kostjuk, 1975
- Eucosma nitorana Kumetzov, 1962
- Eucosma niveicaput (Walsingham, 1900)
- Eucosma obumbratana (Lienig & Zeller, 1846)
- Eucosma ochricostana Razowski, 1972
- Eucosma oculatana (Kennel, 1900)
- Eucosma ommatoptera Falkovitsh, 1965
- Eucosma paetulana (Kennel, 1900)
- Eucosma pergratana (Rebel, 1914)
- Eucosma pupillana (Clerck, 1759)
- Eucosma rigidana (Snellen, 1883)
- Eucosma saussureana (Benander, 1928)
- Eucosma scorzonerana (Benander, 1942)
- Eucosma scutana (Constant, 1893)
- Eucosma striatiradix Kuznetzov, 1964
- Eucosma suomiana (Hoffmann, 1893)
- Eucosma sybillana (Kennel, 1919)
- Eucosma tenebrana (Christoph, 1882)
- Eucosma tetraplana (Moschler, 1866)
- Eucosma tundrana (Kennel, 1900)
- Eucosma ursulana (Kennel, 1919)
- Eucosma victoriana (Kennel, 1919)
- Eucosma wimmerana (Treitschke, 1835)
- Eucosma yasudai Nasu, 1982
- Eucosmomorpha albersana (Hübner, [1813])
- Eucosmomorpha multicolor Kuznetzov, 1964
- Eudemis porphyrana (Hübner, [1799])
- Eudemis profundana ([Denis & Schiffermüller], 1775)
- Eudemopsis purpurissatana (Kennel, 1901)
- Eugnosta dives (Butler, 1878)
- Eugnosta falarica Razowski, 1970
- Eugnosta fenestrana Razowski, 1964
- Eugnosta hydrargyrana (Eversmann, 1842)
- Eugnosta lathoniana (Hübner, [1799])
- Eugnosta magnificana (Rebel, 1914)
- Eugnosta parreyssiana (Duponchel, 1843)
- Eugnosta ussuriana (Caradja, 1926)
- Eulia ministrana (Linnaeus, 1758)
- Eupoecilia ambiguella (Hübner, 1796)
- Eupoecilia angustana (Hübner, [1799])
- Eupoecilia cebrana (Hübner,[1813])
- Eupoecilia citrinana Razowski, 1960
- Eupoecilia inouei Kawabe, 1972
- Eupoecilia sanguisorbana (Herrich-Schäffer, 1856)
- Eurydoxa advena Filipjev, 1930
- Exapate congelatella (Clerck, 1759)
- Falseuncaria degreyana (McLachlan, 1869)
- Falseuncaria kaszabi Razowski, 1966
- Falseuncaria lechriotoma Razowski, 1970
- Falseuncaria rjaboviana Kuznetzov, 1979
- Falseuncaria ruficiliana (Haworth, 1811)
- Fulcrifera luteiceps (Kuznetzov, 1962)
- Fulcrifera orientis (Kuznetzov, 1966)
- Fulvoclysia defectana (Lederer, 1870)
- Fulvoclysia nerminae Kocak, 1982
- Fulvoclysia pallorana (Lederer, 1864)
- Fulvoclysia rjabovi Kumetzov, 1976
- Gibberifera mienshana Kuznetzov, 1971
- Gibberifera simplana (Fischer von Röslerstamm, 1836)
- Gnorismoneura orientis (Filipjev, 1962)
- Grapholita andabatana (Wolff, 1957)
- Grapholita aureolana (Tengstrom, 1848)
- Grapholita auroscriptana Caradja, 1916
- Grapholita caecana (Schlager, 1847)
- Grapholita compositella (Fabricius, 1775)
- Grapholita coronillana (Lienig & Zeller, 1846)
- Grapholita cotoneastri (Danilevsky, 1968)
- Grapholita delineana (Walker, 1863)
- Grapholita difficilana (Walsingham, 1900)
- Grapholita dimorpha Komai, 1979
- Grapholita discretana (Wocke, 1861)
- Grapholita endrosias (Meyrick, 1907)
- Grapholita fimana (Snellen, 1883)
- Grapholita fisana (Frolich, 1828)
- Grapholita funebrana (Treitschke, 1835)
- Grapholita gemmiferana (Treitschke, 1835)
- Grapholita glycyrrhizana (Kuznetzov, 1962)
- Grapholita inopinata (Heinrich, 1928)
- Grapholita janthinana (Duponchel, 1843)
- Grapholita jesonica (Matsumura, 1931)
- Grapholita jungiella (Linnaeus, 1761)
- Grapholita lathyrana (Hübner, [1813])
- Grapholita lobarzewskii (Nowicki, 1860)
- Grapholita lunulana ([Denis & Schiffermüller], 1775)
- Grapholita molesta (Busck, 1916)
- Grapholita nebritana (Treitschke, 1830)
- Grapholita nigrostriana (Snellen, 1883)
- Grapholita orobana (Treitschke, 1830)
- Grapholita pallifrontana (Lienig & Zeller, 1846)
- Grapholita rosana (Danilevsky, 1968)
- Grapholita scintillana (Christoph, 1882)
- Grapholita semifusca (Kuznetzov, 1968)
- Grapholita tenebrosana (Duponchel, 1843)
- Gravitarmata margarotana (Heinemann, 1863)
- Gravitarmata osmana Obraztsov, 1952
- Gynnidomorpha affinitana (Douglas, 1846)
- Gynnidomorpha albipalpana (Zeller, 1847)
- Gynnidomorpha aliena (Kumetzov, 1966)
- Gynnidomorpha alismana (Ragonot, 1883)
- Gynnidomorpha chlorolitha (Meyrick, 1931)
- Gynnidomorpha contractana (Zeller, 1847)
- Gynnidomorpha curvistrigana (Stainton, 1859)
- Gynnidomorpha dysodona (Caradja, 1916)
- Gynnidomorpha fraterna (Razowski, 1970)
- Gynnidomorpha fulvimixta (Filipjev, 1940)
- Gynnidomorpha gilvicomana (Zeller, 1847)
- Gynnidomorpha latifasciana (Razowski, 1970)
- Gynnidomorpha luridana (Gregson, 1870)
- Gynnidomorpha lydiae (Filipjev, 1940)
- Gynnidomorpha manniana (Fischer von Röslerstamm, 1839)
- Gynnidomorpha minimana (Caradja, 1916)
- Gynnidomorpha permixtana ([Denis & Schiffermüller], 1775)
- Gynnidomorpha rubricana (Peyerimhoff, 1877)
- Gynnidomorpha silvestris (Kuznetzov, 1966)
- Gynnidomorpha vectisana (Humphreys & Westwood, 1845)
- Gynnidomorpha zygota (Razowski, 1970)
- Gypsonoma attrita Falkovitsh, 1965
- Gypsonoma bifasciata Kuznetzov, 1966
- Gypsonoma contorta Kuznetzov, 1966
- Gypsonoma dealbana (Frolich, 1828)
- Gypsonoma ephoropa (Meyrick, 1931)
- Gypsonoma holocrypta (Meyrick, 1931)
- Gypsonoma maritima Kuznetzov, 1970
- Gypsonoma mica Kuznetzov, 1966
- Gypsonoma minutana (Hübner, [1799])
- Gypsonoma monotonica Kuznetzov, 1991
- Gypsonoma mutabilana Kuznetzov, 1985
- Gypsonoma nitidulana (Lienig & Zeller, 1846)
- Gypsonoma oppressana (Treitschke, 1835)
- Gypsonoma parryana (Curtis, 1835)
- Gypsonoma sociana (Haworth, 1811)
- Hedya abjecta Falkovitsh, 1962
- Hedya dimidiana (Clerck, 1759)
- Hedya dimidioalba (Retzius, 1783)
- Hedya ignara Falkovitsh, 1962
- Hedya inornata (Walsingham, 1900)
- Hedya ochroleucana (Frolich, 1828)
- Hedya perspicuana (Kennel, 1901)
- Hedya pruniana (Hübner, [1799])
- Hedya salicella (Linnaeus, 1758)
- Hedya semiassana (Kennel, 1901)
- Hedya vicinana (Ragonot, 1894)
- Hedya walsinghami Oku, 1974
- Homonopsis foederatana (Kennel, 1901)
- Homonopsis illotana (Kennel, 1901)
- Homonopsis rubens Kumetzov, 1976
- Hysterophora maculosana (Haworth, 1812)
- Isotrias rectifasciana (Haworth, 1811)
- Kawabea ignavana (Christoph, 1881)
- Kennelia xylinana (Kennel, 1900)
- Laspeyresinia aeologlypta (Meyrick, 1936)
- Lathronympha albimacula Kuznetzov, 1962
- Lathronympha strigana (Fabricius, 1775)
- Leguminivora glycinivorella (Matsumura, 1900)
- Lepteucosma huebneriana (Kocak, 1980)
- Lobesia abscisana (Doubleday, 1849)
- Lobesia artemisiana (Zeller, 1847)
- Lobesia bicinctana (Duponchel, 1844)
- Lobesia botrana ([Denis & Schiffermüller], 1775)
- Lobesia duplicata Falkovitsh, 1970
- Lobesia indusiana (Zeller, 1847)
- Lobesia reliquana Hilbner, [1825]
- Lobesia subherculeana (Filipjev, 1924)
- Lobesia virulenta Bae & Komai, 1991
- Lobesia yasudai Bae & Komai, 1991
- Lobesiodes euphorbiana (Freyer, 1842)
- Lobesiodes occidentis Falkovitsh, 1970
- Lozotaenia coniferana (Issiki, 1961)
- Lozotaenia djakonovi Danilevsky, 1963
- Lozotaenia forsterana (Fabricius, 1781)
- Lozotaenia kumatai Oku, 1963
- Matsumuraeses capax Razowski & Yasuda, 1975
- Matsumuraeses falcana (Walsingham, 1900)
- Matsumuraeses phaseoli (Matsumura, 1900)
- Matsumuraeses ussuriensis (Caradja, 1916)
- Metacosma impolitana Kuznetzov, 1985
- Metendothenia atropunctana (Zetterstedt, 1839)
- Microcorses mirabilis Kuznetzov, 1964
- Microcorses trigonana (Walsingham, 1900)
- Mimarsinania pelulantana (Kennel, 1901)
- Neocalyptis angustilineata (Walsingham, 1900)
- Neocalyptis liratana (Christoph, 1881)
- Neolobesia coccophaga (Falkovitsh, 1970)
- Neosphaleroptera nubilana (Hübner, [1799])
- Notocelia cynosbatella (Linnaeus, 1758)
- Notocelia incarnatana (Hübner, 1800)
- Notocelia nimia Falkovitsh, 1965
- Notocelia roborana ([Denis & Schiffermüller], 1775)
- Notocelia rosaecolana (Doubleday, 1849)
- Notocelia tetragonana (Stephens, 1834)
- Notocelia trimaculana (Haworth, 1811)
- Notocelia uddmanniana (Linnaeus, 1758)
- Olethreutes arcuellus (Clerck, 1759)
- Olethreutes avianus (Falkovitsh, 1959)
- Olethreutes captiosanus (Falkovitsh, 1960)
- Olethreutes obovatus (Walsingham, 1900)
- Olethreutes spiraeanus Kumetzov, 1962
- Olethreutes subtilanus (Falkovitsh, 1959)
- Olindia schumacherana (Fabricius, 1787)
- Oporopsamma wertheimsteini (Rebel, 1913)
- Orientophiaris nigricrista (Kuznetzov, 1976)
- Orthotaenia secunda Falkovitsh, 1962
- Orthotaenia undulana ([Denis & Schiffermüller], 1775)
- Oxypteron impar Staudinger, 1871
- Oxypteron palmoni (Amsel, 1940)
- Pammene aceris Kuznetzov, 1968
- Pammene ainorum Kuznetzov, 1968
- Pammene argyrana (Hübner, [1799])
- Pammene aurana (Fabricius, 1775)
- Pammene aurita Razowski, 1991
- Pammene caeruleata Kuznetzov, 1970
- Pammene christophana (Moschler, 1862)
- Pammene clanculana (Tengstrom, 1869)
- Pammene cytisana (Zeller, 1847)
- Pammene exscribana Kuznetzov, 1986
- Pammene fasciana (Linnaeus, 1761)
- Pammene flavicellula Kuznetzov, 1971
- Pammene gallicana (Guenée, 1845)
- Pammene gallicolana (Lienig & Zeller, 1846)
- Pammene germmana (Hübner, [1799])
- Pammene griseomaculana Kuznetzov, 1960
- Pammene grunini (Kuznetzov, 1960)
- Pammene ignorata Kuznetzov, 1968
- Pammene insolentana Kuznetzov, 1964
- Pammene instructana Kuznetzov, 1964
- Pammene insulana (Guenée, 1845)
- Pammene japonica Kuzuetzov, 1968
- Pammene luculentana Kuznetzov, 1962
- Pammene luedersiana (Sorhagen, 1885)
- Pammene mariana (Zerny, 1920)
- Pammene monotincta Kuznetzov, 1976
- Pammene nemorosa Kuznetzov, 1968
- Pammene obscurana (Stephens, 1834)
- Pammene ochsenheimeriana (Lienig & Zeller, 1846)
- Pammene orientana Kuznetzov, 1960
- Pammene populana (Fabricius, 1787)
- Pammene regiana (Zeller, 1849)
- Pammene rhediella (Clerck, 1759)
- Pammene shicotanica Kuznetzov, 1968
- Pammene splendidulana (Guenée, 1845)
- Pammene subsalvana Kuznetzov, 1960
- Pammene suspectana (Lienig & Zeller, 1846)
- Pammene trauniana ([Denis & Schiffermüller], 1775)
- Pammenodes glaucana (Kennel, 1901)
- Pandemis cerasana (Hübner, 1796)
- Pandemis chondrillana (Herrich-Schäffer, 1860)
- Pandemis cinnamomeana (Treitschke, 1830)
- Pandemis corylana (Fabricius, 1794)
- Pandemis dumetana (Treitschke, 1835)
- Pandemis heparana ([Denis & Schiffermüller], 1775)
- Pandemis ignescana (Kuznetzov, 1976)
- Paracroesia abievora (Issiki, 1961)
- Paramesia gnomana (Clerck, 1759)
- Parapammene aurifascia Kuzuetzov, 1981
- Parapammene dichroramphana (Kennel, 1900)
- Parapammene imitatrix Kuznetzov, 1986
- Parapammene inobservata Kuznetzov, 1962
- Parapammene selectana (Christoph, 1882)
- Paratorna catenulella (Christoph, 1882)
- Paratorna cuprescens Falkovitsh, 1965
- Pelatea klugiana (Freyer, 1834)
- Pelochrista apheliana (Kennel, 1901)
- Pelochrista arabescana (Eversmann, 1844)
- Pelochrista aristidana Rebel, 1910
- Pelochrista caecimaculana (Hübner, [1799])
- Pelochrista caementana (Christoph, 1872)
- Pelochrista dagestana Obraztsov, 1949
- Pelochrista danilevskyi Kostjuk, 1975
- Pelochrista decolorana (Freyer, 1842)
- Pelochrista disquei (Kennel, 1901)
- Pelochrista figurana Razowski, 1972
- Pelochrista huebneriana (Lienig & Zeller, 1846)
- Pelochrista idotatana (Kennel, 1901)
- Pelochrista infidana (Hübner, [1824])
- Pelochrista jodocana (Kennel, 1919)
- Pelochrista kuznetzovi Kostjuk, 1975
- Pelochrista labyrinthicana (Christoph, 1872)
- Pelochrista latericiana (Rebel, 1919)
- Pelochrista lineolana Kumetzov, 1964
- Pelochrista medullana (Staudinger, 1879)
- Pelochrista metria Falkovitsh, 1964
- Pelochrista modicana (Zeller, 1847)
- Pelochrista mollitana (Zeller, 1847)
- Pelochrista obscura Kuznetzov, 1978
- Pelochrista ornata Kumetzov, 1967
- Pelochrista ravana (Kennel, 1900)
- Pelochrista tholera Falkovitsh, 1964
- Pelochrista turiana (Zerny, 1927)
- Pelochrista umbraculana (Eversmann, 1844)
- Periclepsis cinctana ([Denis & Schiffermüller], 1775)
- Peridaedala optabilana (Kuznetzov, 1979)
- Phaneta bimaculata (Kuznetzov, 1966)
- Phaneta pauperana (Duponchel, 1843)
- Phaneta tarandana (Moschler, 1874)
- Phiaris agatha (Falkovitsh, 1966)
- Phiaris bidentata (Kumetzov, 1971)
- Phiaris bipunctana (Fabricius, 1794)
- Phiaris camillana (Kennel, 1919)
- Phiaris delitana (Staudinger, 1880)
- Phiaris dissolutana (Stange, 1866)
- Phiaris dolosana (Kennel, 1901)
- Phiaris examinata (Falkovitsh, 1966)
- Phiaris exilis (Falkovitsh, 1966)
- Phiaris glaciana (Moschler, 1860)
- Phiaris heinrichana (McDunnough, 1927)
- Phiaris hydrangeana (Kuznetzov, 1959)
- Phiaris inquietana (Walker, 1863)
- Phiaris metallicana (Hübner, [1799])
- Phiaris micana ([Denis & Schiffermüller], 1775)
- Phiaris nordeggana (McDunnough, 1922)
- Phiaris obsoletana (Zetterstedt, 1839)
- Phiaris orthocosma (Meyrick, 1931)
- Phiaris palustrana (Lienig & Zeller, 1846)
- Phiaris praeterminata (Caradja, 1933)
- Phiaris schulziana (Fabricius, 1776)
- Phiaris scoriana (Guenée, 1845)
- Phiaris semicremana (Christoph, 1881)
- Phiaris septentrionana (Curtis, 1831)
- Phiaris stibiana (Guenée, 1845)
- Phiaris transversana (Christoph, 1881)
- Phiaris turfosana (Herrich-Schäffer, 1851)
- Phiaris umbrosana (Freyer, 1842)
- Philedone gerningana ([Denis & Schiffermüller], 1775)
- Philedonides lunana (Thunberg, 1784)
- Phtheochroa chalcantha (Meyrick, 1912)
- Phtheochroa decipiens (Walsingham, 1900)
- Phtheochroa exasperatana (Christoph, 1872)
- Phtheochroa farinosana (Herrich-Schäffer, 1856)
- Phtheochroa fulvicinctana (Constant, 1893)
- Phtheochroa inopiana (Haworth, 1811)
- Phtheochroa kenneli (Obraztsov, 1944)
- Phtheochroa krulikovskii (Obraztsov, 1944)
- Phtheochroa pistrinana (Erschoff, 1877)
- Phtheochroa pulvillana (Herrich-Schäffer, 1851)
- Phtheochroa retextana (Erschoff, 1874)
- Phtheochroa schreibersiana (Frolich, 1828)
- Phtheochroa sodaliana (Haworth, 1811)
- Phtheochroa subfumida (Falkovitsh, 1963)
- Phtheochroa thiana Staudinger, 1899
- Phtheochroa unionana (Kennel, 1900)
- Phtheochroa vulnerarana (Zetterstedt, 1839)
- Phtheochroides apicana (Walsingham, 1900)
- Phtheochroides clandestina Razowski, 1968
- Piniphila bifasciana (Haworth, 1811)
- Pristerognatha fuligana ([Denis & Schiffermüller], 1775)
- Pristerognatha penthinana (Guenée, 1845)
- Propiromorpha rhodophana (Herrich-Schäffer, 1851)
- Pseudacroclita luteispecula (Kuznetzov, 1979)
- Pseudargyrotoza conwagana (Fabricius, 1775)
- Pseudeulia asinana (Hübner, [1799])
- Pseudohedya cincinna Falkovitsh, 1962
- Pseudohedya gradana (Christoph, 1882)
- Pseudohedya retracta Falkovitsh, 1962
- Pseudohermenias abietana (Fabricius, 1787)
- Pseudohermenias ajanensis Falkovitsh, 1966
- Pseudosciaphila branderiana (Linnaeus, 1758)
- Ptycholoma erschoffi (Christoph, 1877)
- Ptycholoma imitator (Walsingham, 1900)
- Ptycholoma lecheana (Linnaeus, 1758)
- Ptycholoma micantana (Kennel, 1901)
- Ptycholomoides aeriferanus (Herrich-Schäffer, 1851)
- Retinia coeruleostriana (Caradja, 1939)
- Retinia immanitana (Kuznetzov, 1969)
- Retinia lemniscata (Kuznetzov, 1973)
- Retinia monopunctata (Oku, 1968)
- Retinia perangustana (Snellen, 1883)
- Retinia resinella (Linnaeus, 1758)
- Rhopalovalva exartemana (Kennel, 1901)
- Rhopalovalva grapholitana (Caradja, 1916)
- Rhopalovalva lascivana (Christoph, 1882)
- Rhopalovalva pulchra (Butler, 1879)
- Rhopobota latipennis Walsingham, 1900
- Rhopobota myrtillana (Humphreys & Westwood, 1845)
- Rhopobota naevana (Hübner, [1817])
- Rhopobota relicta (Kuznetzov, 1968)
- Rhopobota stagnana ([Denis & Schiffermüller], 1775)
- Rhopobota ustomaculana (Curtis, 1831)
- Rhyacionia buoliana ([Denis & Schiffermüller], 1775)
- Rhyacionia dativa Heinrich, 1928
- Rhyacionia duplana (Hübner, [1813])
- Rhyacionia logaea Durrant, 1911
- Rhyacionia piniana (Herrich-Schäffer, 1851)
- Rhyacionia pinicolana (Doubleday, 1849)
- Rhyacionia pinivorana (Lienig & Zeller, 1846)
- Rudisociaria expeditana (Snellen, 1883)
- Rudisociaria irina (Falkovitsh, 1966)
- Rudisociaria velutina (Walsingham, 1900)
- Saliciphaga acharis (Butler, 1879)
- Saliciphaga caesia Falkovitsh, 1962
- Salsolicola stshetkini Kuznetzov, 1960
- Selenodes karelica (Tengstrom, 1875)
- Semnostola magnifica (Kuznetzov, 1964)
- Semnostola trisignifera Kumetzov, 1970
- Sillybiphora devia Kuznetzov, 1964
- Sorolopha agana Falkovitsh, 1966
- Sparganothis pilleriana ([Denis & Schiffermüller], 1775)
- Sparganothis praecana (Kennel, 1900)
- Sparganothis rubicundana (Herrich-Schäffer, 1856)
- Spatalistis bifasciana (Hübner, 1787)
- Spatalistis christophana (Walsingham, 1900)
- Spatalistis egesta Razowski, 1974
- Spilonota albicana (Motschulsky, 1866)
- Spilonota eremitana Moriuti, 1972
- Spilonota laricana (Heinemann, 1863)
- Spilonota ocellana ([Denis & Schiffermüller], 1775)
- Spilonota prognathana (Snellen, 1883)
- Spilonota semirufana (Christoph, 1882)
- Statherotmantis peregrina (Falkovitsh, 1966)
- Statherotmantis pictana (Kuzuetzov, 1969)
- Statherotmantis shicorana (Kuznetzov, 1969)
- Stenopteron stenoptera (Filipjev, 1962)
- Stictea mygindiana ([Denis &, Schiffermüller], 1775)
- Strepsicrates coriariae Oku, 1974
- Strophedra nitidana (Fabricius, 1794)
- Strophedra quercivora (Meyrick, 1920)
- Strophedra weirana (Douglas, 1850)
- Syndemis musculana (Hübner, [1799])
- Syricoris doubledayana Barrett, 1872
- Syricoris hemiplaca (Meyrick, 1922)
- Syricoris lacunana ([Denis & Schiffermüller], 1775)
- Syricoris moderata (Falkovitsh, 1962)
- Syricoris mori (Matsumura, 1900)
- Syricoris paleana (Caradja, 1916)
- Syricoris pryerana (Walsingham, 1900)
- Syricoris rivulana (Scopoli, 1763)
- Syricoris siderana (Treitschke, 1835)
- Syricoris symmathetes (Caradja, 1916)
- Syricoris tiedemanniana (Zeller, 1845)
- Terricula violetana (Kawabe, 1964)
- Tetramoera flammeata (Kumetzov, 1971)
- Thaumatographa decoris (Diakonoff & Arita, 1976)
- Thiodia citrana (Hübner, [1799])
- Thiodia dahurica (Falkovitsh, 1965)
- Thiodia irinae Budashkin, 1990
- Thiodia lerneana Treitschke, 1835
- Thiodia placidana (Staudinger, 1871)
- Thiodia sulphurana (Christoph, 1888)
- Thiodia torridana (Lederer, 1859)
- Thiodia trochilana (Frolich, 1828)
- Tia enervana (Erschoff, 1877)
- Tortricodes alternella ([Denis & Schiffermüller], 1775)
- Tortrix sinapina (Butler, 1879)
- Tortrix viridana Linnaeus, 1758
- Tosirips perpulchranus (Kennel, 1901)
- Ukamenia sapporensis (Matsumura, 1931)
- Xerocnephasia rigana (Sodoffsky, 1829)
- Zeiraphera argutana (Christoph, 1881)
- Zeiraphera atra Falkovitsh, 1965
- Zeiraphera bicolora Kawabe, 1976
- Zeiraphera corpulentana (Kennel, 1901)
- Zeiraphera demutata (Walsingham, 1900)
- Zeiraphera fulvomixtana Kawabe, 1974
- Zeiraphera funesta Filipjev, 1930
- Zeiraphera griseana (Hübner, [1799])
- Zeiraphera isertana (Fabricius, 1794)
- Zeiraphera ratzeburgiana (Saxesen, 1840)
- Zeiraphera rufimitrana (Herrich-Schäffer, 1851)
- Zeiraphera subcorticana (Snellen, 1883)
- Zeiraphera virinea Falkovitsh, 1965
