= Aphelia insincera =

Scientific classification
- Domain: Eukaryota
- Kingdom: Animalia
- Phylum: Arthropoda
- Class: Insecta
- Order: Lepidoptera
- Family: Tortricidae
- Genus: Aphelia
- Species: A. insincera

Binomial name
- Aphelia insincera (Meyrick, 1912)

Synonyms
- Tortrix insincera Meyrick, 1912

Species of moth

Aphelia insincera is a species of moth of the family Tortricidae. It is found in Asia Minor.
