= Aphelia flexiloqua =

Scientific classification
- Kingdom: Animalia
- Phylum: Arthropoda
- Class: Insecta
- Order: Lepidoptera
- Family: Tortricidae
- Genus: Aphelia
- Species: A. flexiloqua

Binomial name
- Aphelia flexiloqua Razowski, 1984

Species of moth

Aphelia flexiloqua is a species of moth of the family Tortricidae. It is found in Yunnan, China.
