= Aphelia gregalis =

Scientific classification
- Kingdom: Animalia
- Phylum: Arthropoda
- Class: Insecta
- Order: Lepidoptera
- Family: Tortricidae
- Genus: Aphelia
- Species: A. gregalis

Binomial name
- Aphelia gregalis Razowski, 1981

Species of moth

Aphelia gregalis is a species of moth of the family Tortricidae. It is found in North America, where it has been recorded from Alaska.

The wingspan is about 21 mm.
