= Aphelia cinerarialis =

Scientific classification
- Domain: Eukaryota
- Kingdom: Animalia
- Phylum: Arthropoda
- Class: Insecta
- Order: Lepidoptera
- Family: Tortricidae
- Genus: Aphelia
- Species: A. cinerarialis

Binomial name
- Aphelia cinerarialis Bai, 1992

Species of moth

Aphelia cinerarialis is a species of moth of the family Tortricidae. It is found in Beijing, China.
