= Streltzoviella =

Scientific classification
- Kingdom: Animalia
- Phylum: Arthropoda
- Clade: Pancrustacea
- Class: Insecta
- Order: Lepidoptera
- Family: Cossidae
- Subfamily: Cossinae
- Genus: Streltzoviella; Yakovlev, 2006

Genus of moths

Streltzoviella is a genus of moths in the family Cossidae.

== Species ==
- Streltzoviella insularis (Staudinger, 1892)
- Streltzoviella owadai Yakovlev, 2011

== Etymology ==
The genus is named in honour of Dr. Alexander N. Streltzov.
