= Aphelia effigies =

Scientific classification
- Domain: Eukaryota
- Kingdom: Animalia
- Phylum: Arthropoda
- Class: Insecta
- Order: Lepidoptera
- Family: Tortricidae
- Genus: Aphelia
- Species: A. effigies

Binomial name
- Aphelia effigies (Obraztsov, 1968)

Synonyms
- Clepsis effigies Obraztsov, 1968

Species of moth

Aphelia effigies is a species of moth of the family Tortricidae. It is found in the country of Georgia.
