= Aphelia deserticolor =

Scientific classification
- Domain: Eukaryota
- Kingdom: Animalia
- Phylum: Arthropoda
- Class: Insecta
- Order: Lepidoptera
- Family: Tortricidae
- Genus: Aphelia
- Species: A. deserticolor

Binomial name
- Aphelia deserticolor Diakonoff, 1983

Species of moth

Aphelia deserticolor is a species of moth of the family Tortricidae. It is found in Saudi Arabia.
