= Aphelia galilaeica =

Scientific classification
- Domain: Eukaryota
- Kingdom: Animalia
- Phylum: Arthropoda
- Class: Insecta
- Order: Lepidoptera
- Family: Tortricidae
- Genus: Aphelia
- Species: A. galilaeica

Binomial name
- Aphelia galilaeica Obraztsov, 1968

Species of moth

Aphelia galilaeica is a species of moth of the family Tortricidae. It is found in Israel.
