= Streltzoviella owadai =

Scientific classification
- Kingdom: Animalia
- Phylum: Arthropoda
- Clade: Pancrustacea
- Class: Insecta
- Order: Lepidoptera
- Family: Cossidae
- Genus: Streltzoviella
- Species: S. owadai

Binomial name
- Streltzoviella owadai Yakovlev, 2011

Species of moth

Streltzoviella owadai is a species of moth of the family Cossidae. It is found in northern Vietnam.
