= Aphelia mongoliana =

Scientific classification
- Kingdom: Animalia
- Phylum: Arthropoda
- Class: Insecta
- Order: Lepidoptera
- Family: Tortricidae
- Genus: Aphelia
- Species: A. mongoliana

Binomial name
- Aphelia mongoliana Razowski, 1981

Species of moth

Aphelia mongoliana is a species of moth of the family Tortricidae. It is found in Mongolia.
