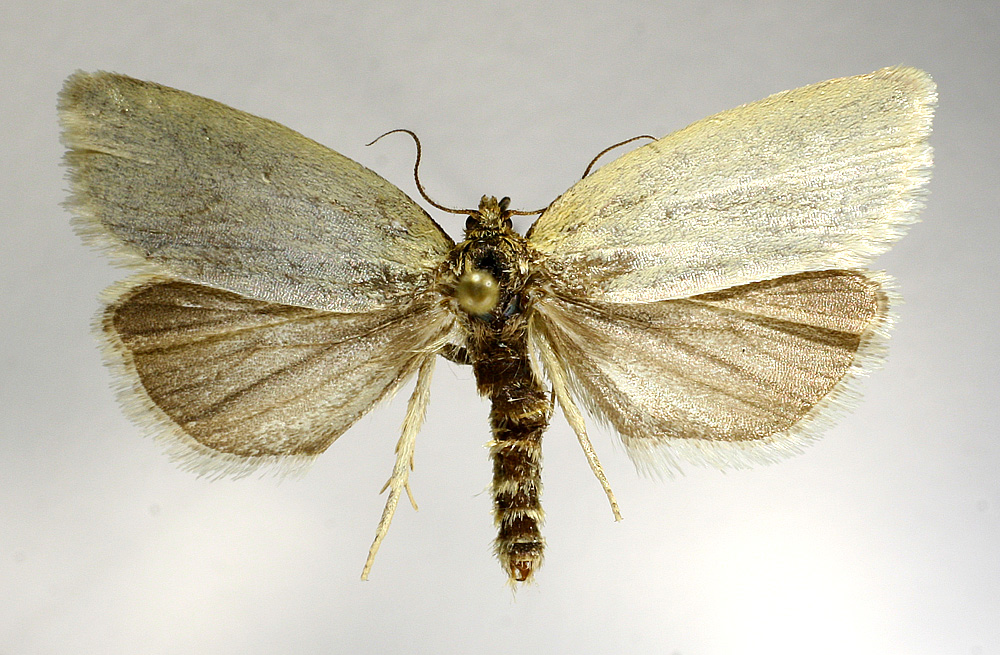

Scientific classification
- Kingdom: Animalia
- Phylum: Arthropoda
- Clade: Pancrustacea
- Class: Insecta
- Order: Lepidoptera
- Family: Tortricidae
- Genus: Aphelia
- Species: A. unitana

Binomial name
- Aphelia unitana (Hübner, 1799)

Synonyms
- Tortrix unitana Hubner, [1796-1799]; Tortrix paleana carpathica Toll, 1951; Tortrix paleana fischeri Toll, 1951; Tortrix paleana fumatana Toll, 1951; Tortrix paleana pseudoviburniana Toll, 1951

= Aphelia unitana =

Species of moth

Aphelia unitana is a moth of the family Tortricidae. It is found from Ireland and Great Britain, east Fennoscandia and central and south-eastern Europe to the Russian Far East and the Near East.

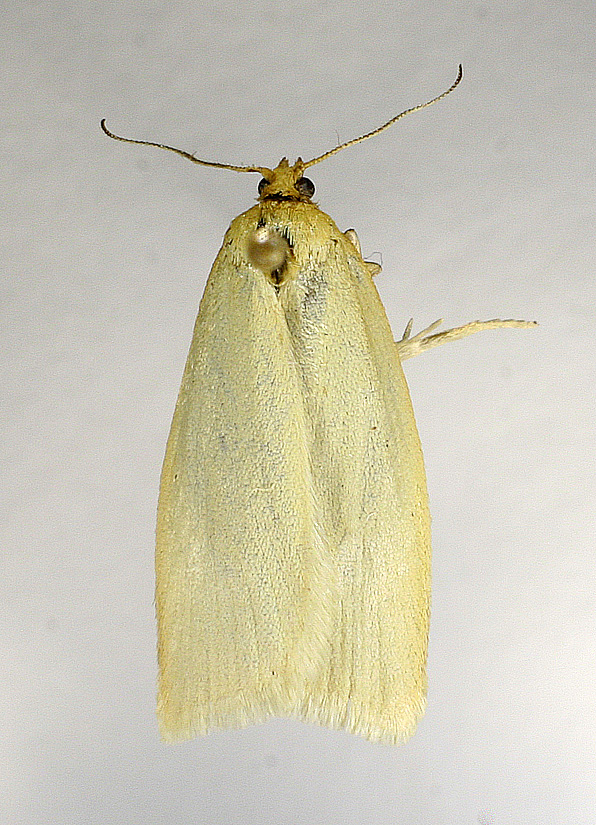

The wingspan is 17–24 mm. The body is dark, the forewing is silky grey, often with darker outer margin. All wings have white fringes. The hindwings are grey, slightly darkened behind the wing tip. It is very similar to Aphelia paleana.

Adults are on wing from June to July.

The larvae feed on various low-growing plants, including Heracleum and Rubus species. They feed between spun leaves.
