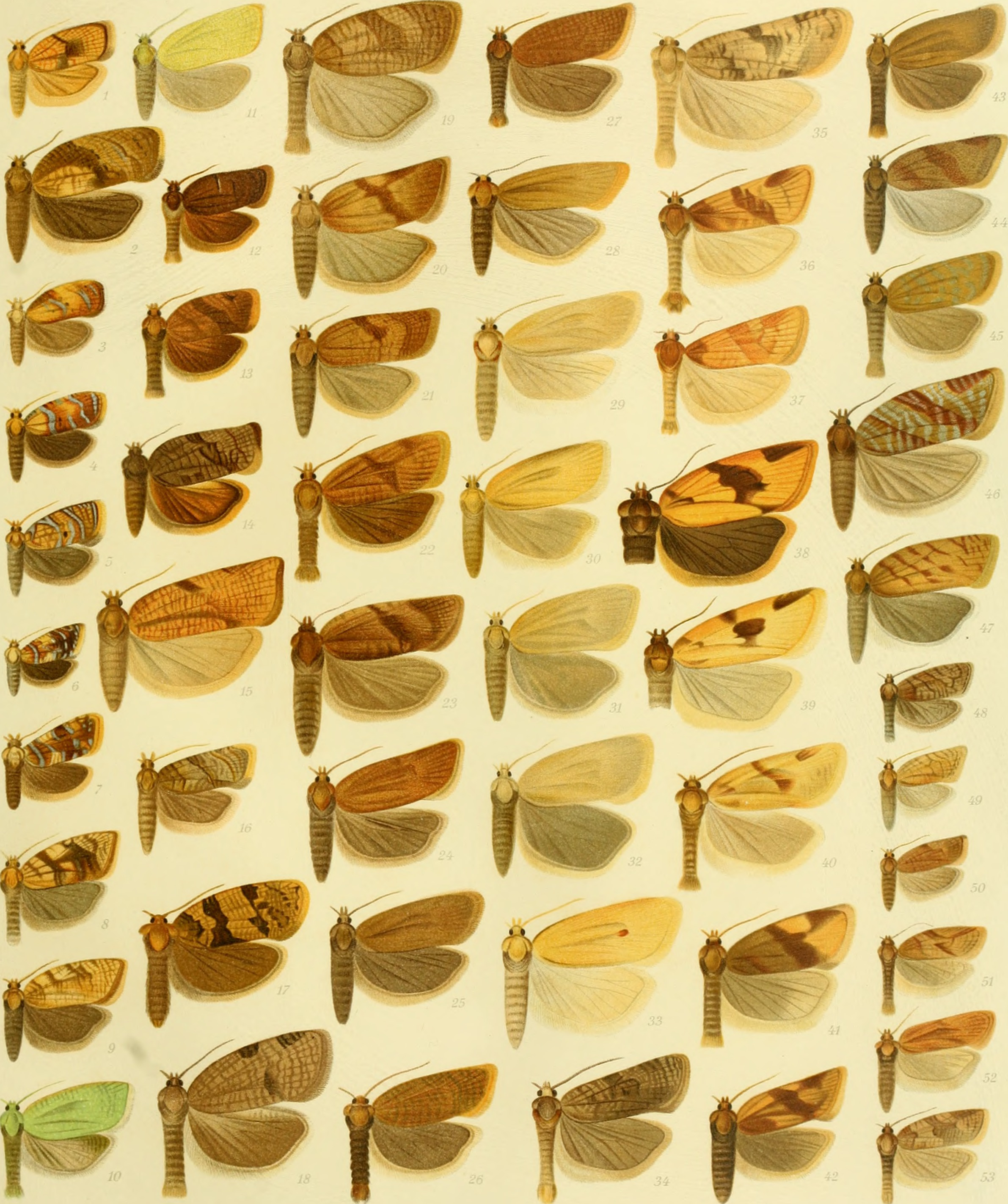
- Aphelia christophi in Kennel Die palaearktischen tortriciden fig 29 as Tortrix verbascana Chr female

Scientific classification
- Domain: Eukaryota
- Kingdom: Animalia
- Phylum: Arthropoda
- Class: Insecta
- Order: Lepidoptera
- Family: Tortricidae
- Genus: Aphelia
- Species: A. christophi

Binomial name
- Aphelia christophi Obraztsov, 1955

Synonyms
- Tortrix verbascana Christoph, 1877

= Aphelia christophi =

Species of moth

Aphelia christophi is a species of moth of the family Tortricidae. It is found in the Elburz Mountains in Iran.

The wingspan is about 28 mm for females and 23–26 mm for males.
