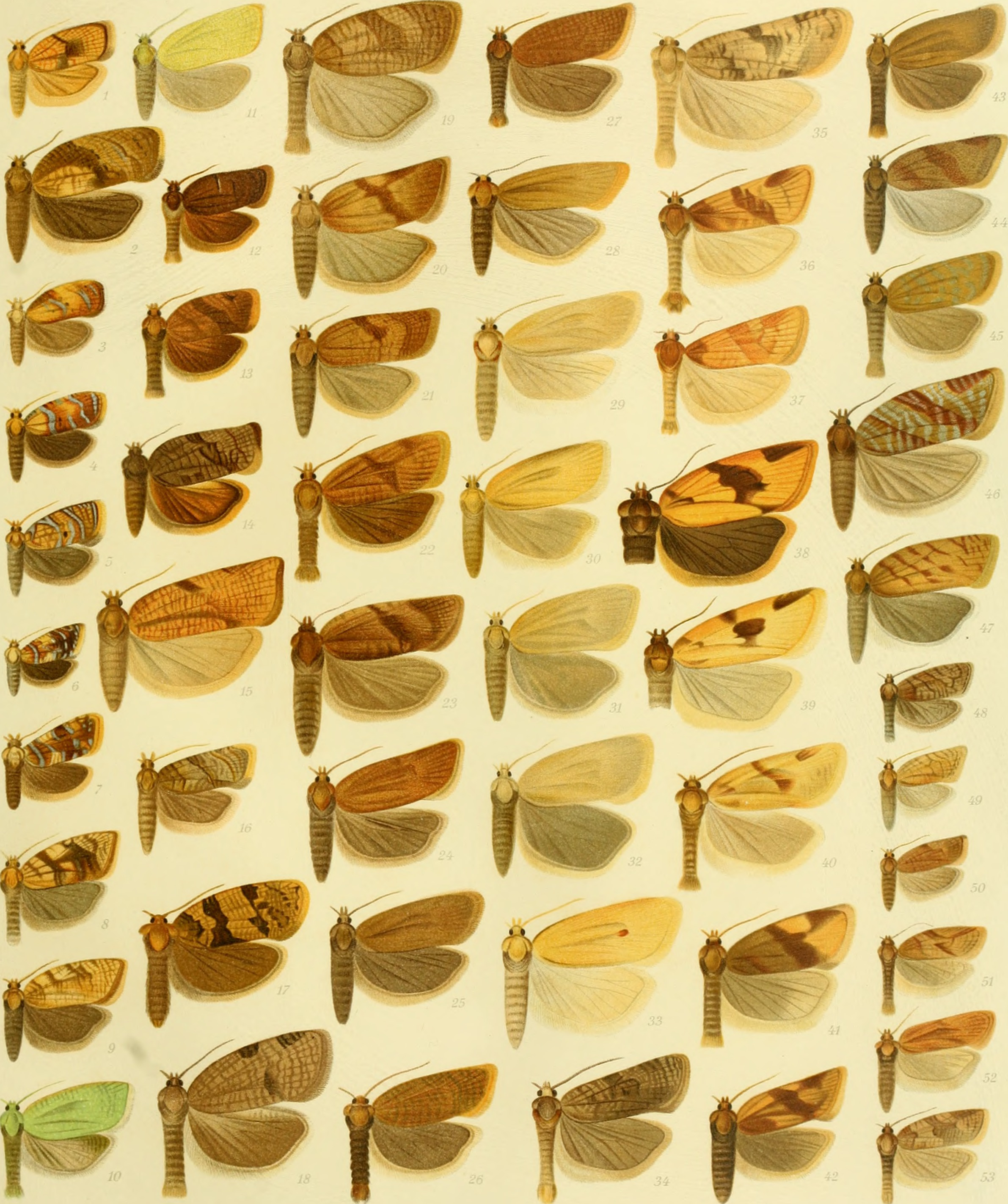
- Aphelia imperfectana in Kennel Die palaearktischen tortriciden figure 40 male

Scientific classification
- Domain: Eukaryota
- Kingdom: Animalia
- Phylum: Arthropoda
- Class: Insecta
- Order: Lepidoptera
- Family: Tortricidae
- Genus: Aphelia
- Species: A. imperfectana

Binomial name
- Aphelia imperfectana (Lederer, 1859)

Synonyms
- Tortrix imperfectana Lederer, 1859; Aphelia ineffecta Obraztsov, 1968

= Aphelia imperfectana =

Species of moth

Aphelia imperfectana is a species of moth of the family Tortricidae. It is found in Lebanon.
