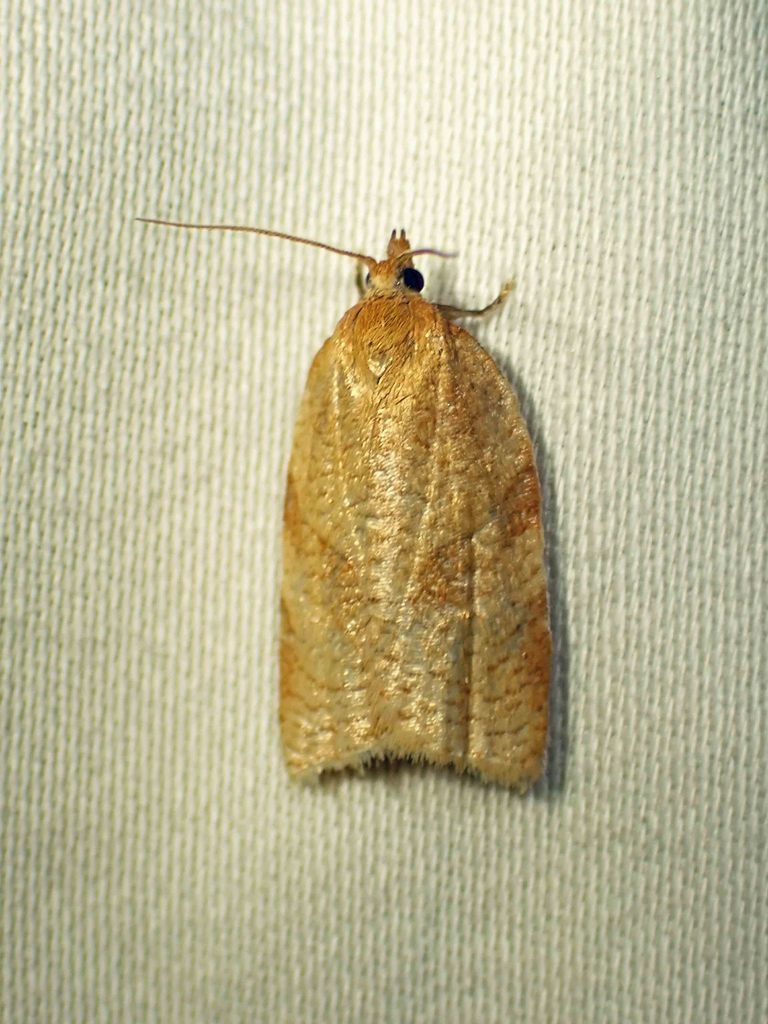

Scientific classification
- Kingdom: Animalia
- Phylum: Arthropoda
- Clade: Pancrustacea
- Class: Insecta
- Order: Lepidoptera
- Family: Tortricidae
- Genus: Aphelia
- Species: A. alleniana

Binomial name
- Aphelia alleniana (Fernald, 1882)

Synonyms
- Tortrix alleniana Fernald, 1882; Tortrix allenana Llewellyn-Jones, 1935; Tortrix trentonana McDunnough, 1923

= Aphelia alleniana =

Wide-striped leafroller

Species of moth

Aphelia alleniana, the wide-striped leafroller, is a species of moth of the family Tortricidae. It is found in North America, where it has been recorded throughout Canada, as far north as Alaska. In the United States, it has been recorded from Colorado, Maine and Montana.

The wingspan is 21–27 mm. Adults are on wing from late June to mid-July.

== Subspecies ==
- Aphelia alleniana alleniana
- Aphelia alleniana rindgeorum Obraztsov, 1959
