= Aphelia conscia =

Scientific classification
- Kingdom: Animalia
- Phylum: Arthropoda
- Class: Insecta
- Order: Lepidoptera
- Family: Tortricidae
- Genus: Aphelia
- Species: A. conscia

Binomial name
- Aphelia conscia Razowski, 1981

Synonyms
- Aphelia (Zelotherses) consica

Species of moth

Aphelia conscia is a species of moth of the family Tortricidae. It is found in Fars province, Iran.
