= Aphelia icteratana =

Scientific classification
- Domain: Eukaryota
- Kingdom: Animalia
- Phylum: Arthropoda
- Class: Insecta
- Order: Lepidoptera
- Family: Tortricidae
- Genus: Aphelia
- Species: A. icteratana

Binomial name
- Aphelia icteratana (Staudinger, 1880)

Synonyms
- Tortrix icteratana Staudinger, 1880

Species of moth

Aphelia icteratana is a species of moth of the family Tortricidae. It is found in Turkey.
