= Aphelia corroborata =

Scientific classification
- Kingdom: Animalia
- Phylum: Arthropoda
- Class: Insecta
- Order: Lepidoptera
- Family: Tortricidae
- Genus: Aphelia
- Species: A. corroborata

Binomial name
- Aphelia corroborata (Meyrick, 1918)

Synonyms
- Tortrix corroborata Meyrick, 1918

Species of moth

Aphelia corroborata is a species of moth of the family Tortricidae. It is found in South Africa.
