= Aphelia albidula =

Scientific classification
- Domain: Eukaryota
- Kingdom: Animalia
- Phylum: Arthropoda
- Class: Insecta
- Order: Lepidoptera
- Family: Tortricidae
- Genus: Aphelia
- Species: A. albidula

Binomial name
- Aphelia albidula Bai, 1992

Species of moth

Aphelia albidula is a species of moth of the family Tortricidae. It is found in China, where it has been recorded from Jilin (Jingyuetan Forest Farm) and Beijing (Mount Baihuashan).
