= Aphelia koebelei =

Scientific classification
- Domain: Eukaryota
- Kingdom: Animalia
- Phylum: Arthropoda
- Class: Insecta
- Order: Lepidoptera
- Family: Tortricidae
- Genus: Aphelia
- Species: A. koebelei

Binomial name
- Aphelia koebelei Obraztsov, 1959

Species of moth

Aphelia koebelei is a species of moth of the family Tortricidae first described by Obraztsov in 1959. It is found in North America, where it has been recorded from Alberta and the Northwest Territories east to Newfoundland. It has also been recorded in Washington.
