= Aphelia finita =

Scientific classification
- Domain: Eukaryota
- Kingdom: Animalia
- Phylum: Arthropoda
- Class: Insecta
- Order: Lepidoptera
- Family: Tortricidae
- Genus: Aphelia
- Species: A. finita

Binomial name
- Aphelia finita (Meyrick, 1924)

Synonyms
- Cnephasia finita Meyrick, 1924

Species of moth

Aphelia finita is a species of moth of the family Tortricidae. It is found in South Africa.
