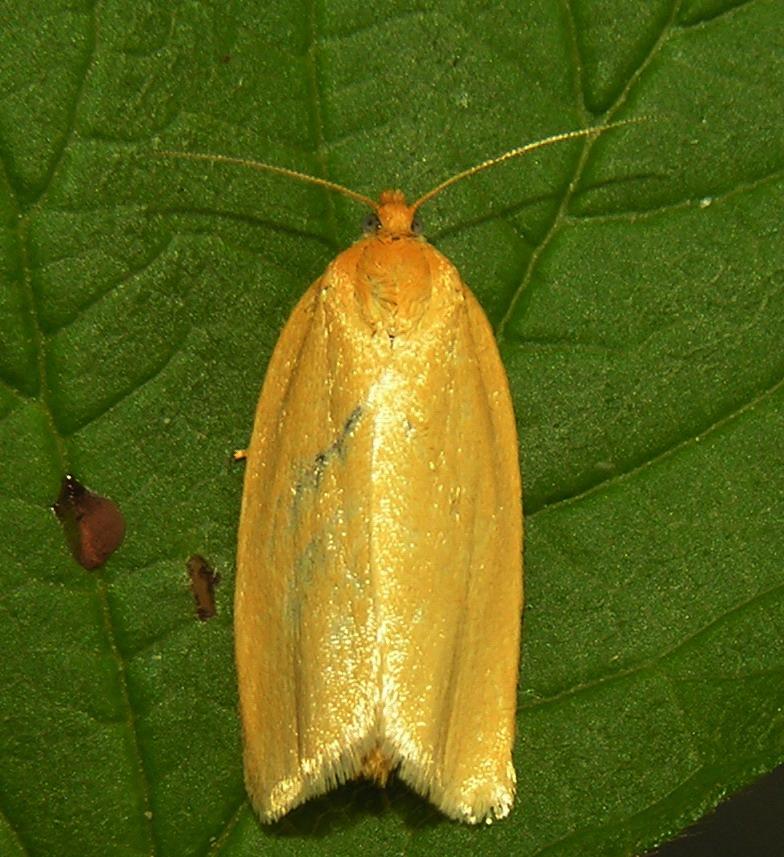
- Aphelia paleana

Scientific classification
- Domain: Eukaryota
- Kingdom: Animalia
- Phylum: Arthropoda
- Class: Insecta
- Order: Lepidoptera
- Family: Tortricidae
- Tribe: Archipini
- Genus: Aphelia; Hübner, [1825]

= Aphelia (moth) =

Genus of tortrix moths

Aphelia is a genus of tortrix moths in tribe Archipini.

== Species ==
- Aphelia aglossana (Kennel, 1899)
- Aphelia albidula Bai, 1992
- Aphelia albociliana (Herrich-Schaffer, 1851)
- Aphelia alleniana (Fernald, 1882)
- Aphelia caradjana (Caradja, 1916)
- Aphelia caucasica Kostyuk, 1975
- Aphelia christophi Obraztsov, 1955
- Aphelia cinerarialis Bai, 1992
- Aphelia conscia Razowski, 1981
- Aphelia corroborata (Meyrick, 1918)
- Aphelia deserticolor Diakonoff, 1983
- Aphelia disjuncta (Filipjev, 1924)
- Aphelia effigies (Obraztsov, 1968)
- Aphelia euxina (Djakonov, 1929)
- Aphelia finita (Meyrick, 1924)
- Aphelia flexiloqua Razowski, 1984
- Aphelia fuscialis Bai, 1992
- Aphelia galilaeica Obraztsov, 1968
- Aphelia gregalis Razowski, 1981
- Aphelia icteratana (Staudinger, 1880)
- Aphelia ignoratana (Staudinger, 1880)
- Aphelia imperfectana (Lederer, 1859)
- Aphelia insincera (Meyrick, 1912)
- Aphelia inumbratana (Christoph, 1881)
- Aphelia koebelei Obraztsov, 1959
- Aphelia mongoliana Razowski, 1981
- Aphelia ochreana (Hubner, [1796-1799])
- Aphelia paleana (Hubner, 1793)
- Aphelia peramplana (Hubner, [1825] 1816)
- Aphelia plagiferana (Rebel, 1916)
- Aphelia polyglochina Razowski, 1981
- Aphelia septentrionalis Obraztsov, 1959
- Aphelia stigmatana (Eversmann, 1844)
- Aphelia tshetverikovi Danilevsky, 1963
- Aphelia unitana (Hubner, [1796-1799])
- Aphelia viburnana ([Denis & Schiffermuller], 1775)

== Synonyms ==
- Amelia Hübner, [1825] 1816
- Anaphelia Razowski, 1981 [subgenus of Aphelia]
- Djakonovia Obraztsov, 1942 [subgenus of Aphelia]
- Sacaphelia Razowski, 1981 [subgenus of Aphelia]
- Tortricomorpha Amsel, 1955 [preoccupied]
- Zelotherses Lederer, 1859 [subgenus of Aphelia]

== See also ==
- List of Tortricidae genera
