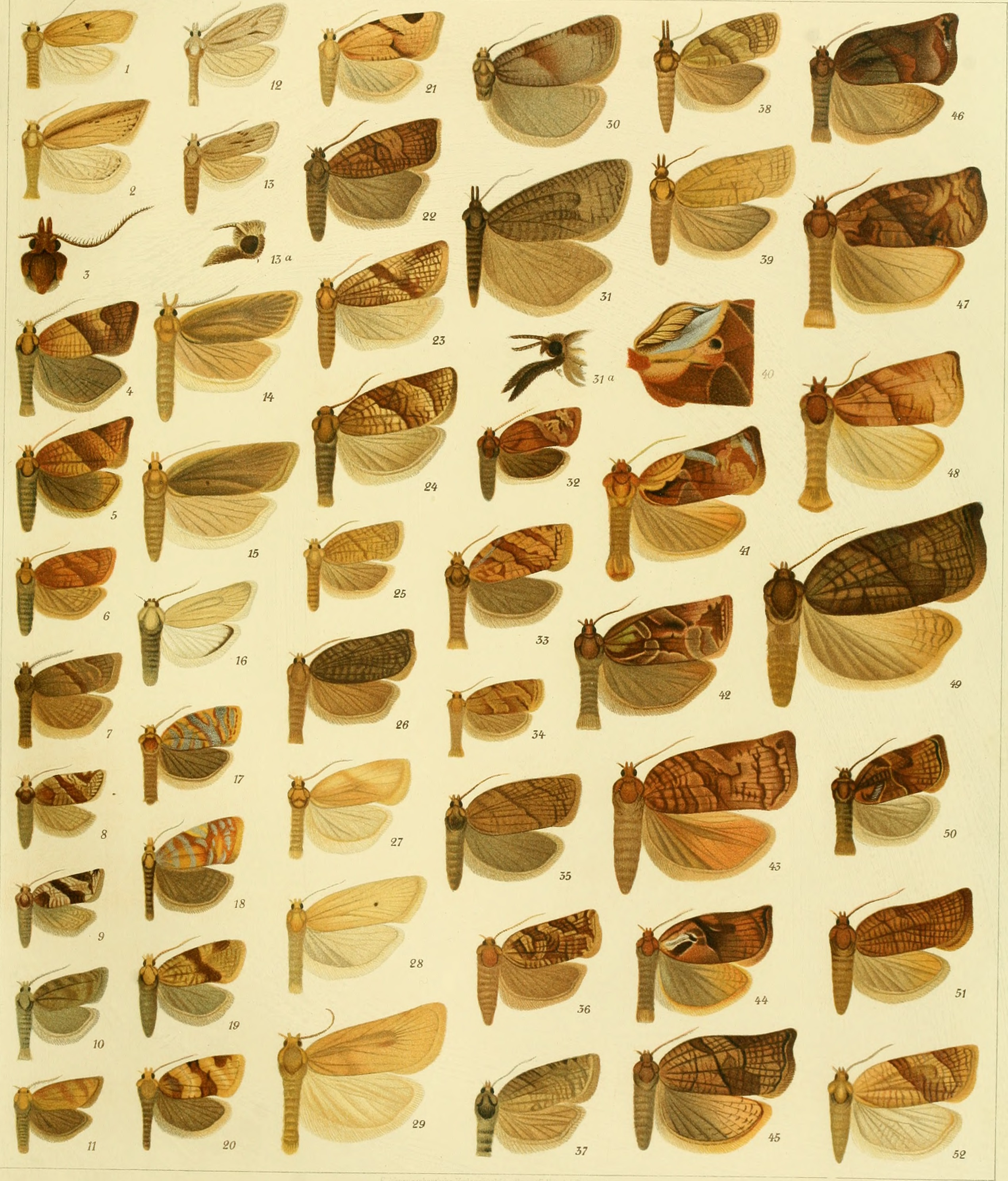
- Aphelia ignoratana in Kennel Die palaearktischen tortriciden figure 29 male

Scientific classification
- Domain: Eukaryota
- Kingdom: Animalia
- Phylum: Arthropoda
- Class: Insecta
- Order: Lepidoptera
- Family: Tortricidae
- Genus: Aphelia
- Species: A. ignoratana

Binomial name
- Aphelia ignoratana (Staudinger, 1880)

Synonyms
- Tortrix ignoratana Staudinger, 1880

= Aphelia ignoratana =

Species of moth

Aphelia ignoratana is a species of moth of the family Tortricidae. It is found in Turkey.
