= Aphelia plagiferana =

Scientific classification
- Domain: Eukaryota
- Kingdom: Animalia
- Phylum: Arthropoda
- Class: Insecta
- Order: Lepidoptera
- Family: Tortricidae
- Genus: Aphelia
- Species: A. plagiferana

Binomial name
- Aphelia plagiferana (Rebel, 1916)

Synonyms
- Tortrix plagiferana Rebel, 1916

Species of moth

Aphelia plagiferana is a species of moth of the family Tortricidae. It is found in Mongolia.
