= Bembecia puella =

Scientific classification
- Domain: Eukaryota
- Kingdom: Animalia
- Phylum: Arthropoda
- Class: Insecta
- Order: Lepidoptera
- Family: Sesiidae
- Genus: Bembecia
- Species: B. puella

Binomial name
- Bembecia puella Z. Lastuvka, 1989

Synonyms
- Bembecia daghestanica Gorbunov, 1991; Bembecia aladagica Gorbunov & Špatenka, 2001

Species of moth

Bembecia puella is a moth of the family Sesiidae. It is found in Slovakia, Hungary, Romania, Bulgaria, Greece, Ukraine and Russia. It has also been recorded from Kazakhstan.

The wingspan is 22–23 mm.

The larvae feed on Astragalus glycyphyllos, Astragalus odoratus and Astragalus sigmoideus.
