= Aphelia euxina =

Scientific classification
- Domain: Eukaryota
- Kingdom: Animalia
- Phylum: Arthropoda
- Class: Insecta
- Order: Lepidoptera
- Family: Tortricidae
- Genus: Aphelia
- Species: A. euxina

Binomial name
- Aphelia euxina (Djakonov, 1929)

Synonyms
- Tortrix euxina Djakonov, 1929; Tortrix regisborissi Drenovski, 1931

Species of moth

Aphelia euxina is a species of moth of the family Tortricidae. It is found in Bulgaria, North Macedonia, Greece, Ukraine and the Near East.

The wingspan is 12–17 mm. Adults have been recorded on wing from May to July.
