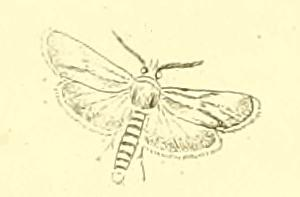

Scientific classification
- Domain: Eukaryota
- Kingdom: Animalia
- Phylum: Arthropoda
- Class: Insecta
- Order: Lepidoptera
- Family: Brachodidae
- Genus: Brachodes
- Species: B. fulgurita

Binomial name
- Brachodes fulgurita (Fischer von Waldheim, 1832)

Synonyms
- Chimaera fulgurita Fischer von Waldheim, 1832; Atychia confinis Boisduval, 1875; Atychia exilis Herrich-Schäffer, 1852; Chimaera orbonata Freyer, 1842; Chimaera pusilla Eversmann, 1841; Brachodes pusilla

= Brachodes fulgurita =

Species of moth

Brachodes fulgurita is a moth of the family Brachodidae. It is found in Russia.
