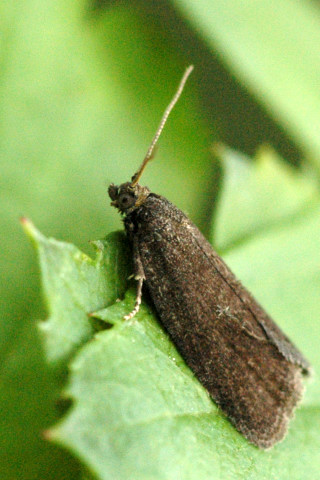

Scientific classification
- Domain: Eukaryota
- Kingdom: Animalia
- Phylum: Arthropoda
- Class: Insecta
- Order: Lepidoptera
- Family: Tortricidae
- Genus: Aphelia
- Species: A. viburnana

Binomial name
- Aphelia viburnana (Denis & Schiffermüller, 1775)

Synonyms
- Tortrix viburnana [Denis & Schiffermuller], 1775; Aphelia (Aphelia) viburnana; Pyralis viburniana Fabricius, 1787; Aphelia viburniana [Denis & Schiffermüller, 1775]; Tortrix altaica Caradja, 1916; Tortrix brunneana Zetterstedt, 1839; Tortrix donelana Carpenter, 1891; Tortrix galiana Curtis, 1829; Tortrix galiana Stephens, 1834; Tortrix geleana Humphreys & Westwood, 1845; Aphelia obsolescentana Ral, 1990; Tortrix scrophulariana Herrich-Schaffer, 1851; Tortrix teucriana Tutt, 1890; Tortrix unipunctana Tengstrom, 1848

= Aphelia viburnana =

Bilberry tortrix

Species of moth

Aphelia viburnana, the bilberry tortrix, is a moth of the family Tortricidae. It is found in Europe, from Portugal and Great Britain to the Ural Mountains, Siberia and Mongolia, further east to the Russian Far East (Primorsk and the Kuril Islands).

The length of the forewings is about 11 mm. The forewings are narrowed anteriorly and ochreous-brownish, sometimes faintly strigulated with ferruginous. The central fascia and costal patch are sometimes obscurely darker. The hindwings are grey. The larva is pale olive -green or green - blackish; spots white; head and plate of 2 pale brown, black-marked Julius von Kennel provides a full description.

The moth flies from June to September in western Europe.

The larvae feed on Vaccinium and Ericaceae, but also Salix species.

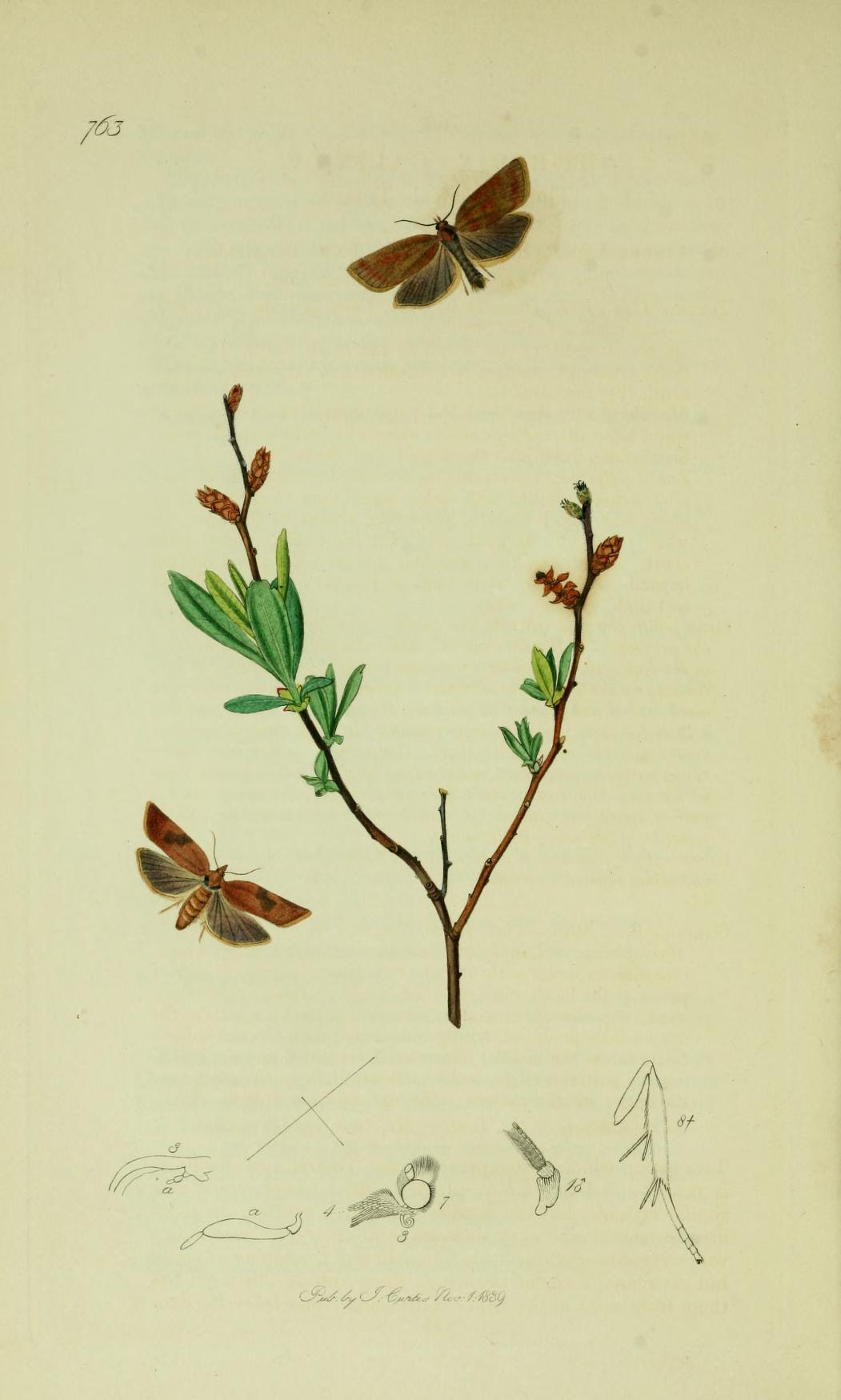
Illustration from John Curtis's British Entomology Volume 6
