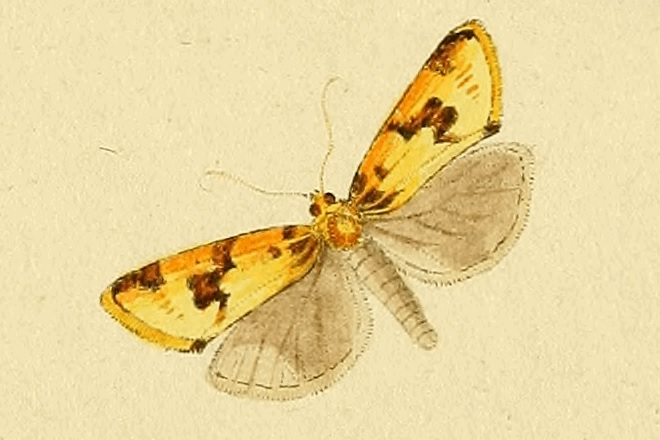

Scientific classification
- Kingdom: Animalia
- Phylum: Arthropoda
- Clade: Pancrustacea
- Class: Insecta
- Order: Lepidoptera
- Family: Tortricidae
- Genus: Aphelia
- Species: A. peramplana

Binomial name
- Aphelia peramplana (Hubner, [1825] 1816)

Synonyms
- Epagoge peramplana Hubner, [1825] 1816; Tortrix amplana Hubner, [1811–1813]; Tortrix chrysitana Hubner, [1830]; Tortrix amplana f. vallettai Bradley, 1953

= Aphelia peramplana =

Species of moth

Aphelia peramplana is a species of moth of the family Tortricidae. It is found from Portugal to Greece, as well as in North Africa (Morocco, Tunisia), Malta, Crete, Iraq, from Iran east to Transcaucasia and in Siberia and Asia Minor.

The wingspan is 25–31.5 mm.

The larvae feed on Salix, Anemone, Ononis and Asphodelus species, as well as Pulsatilla pratensis and Calendula arvensis. Larvae can be found in April and May.
