= Aphelia septentrionalis =

Scientific classification
- Domain: Eukaryota
- Kingdom: Animalia
- Phylum: Arthropoda
- Class: Insecta
- Order: Lepidoptera
- Family: Tortricidae
- Genus: Aphelia
- Species: A. septentrionalis

Binomial name
- Aphelia septentrionalis Obraztsov, 1959

Species of moth

Aphelia septentrionalis is a species of moth of the family Tortricidae. It is found in North America, where it has been recorded from Alaska.
