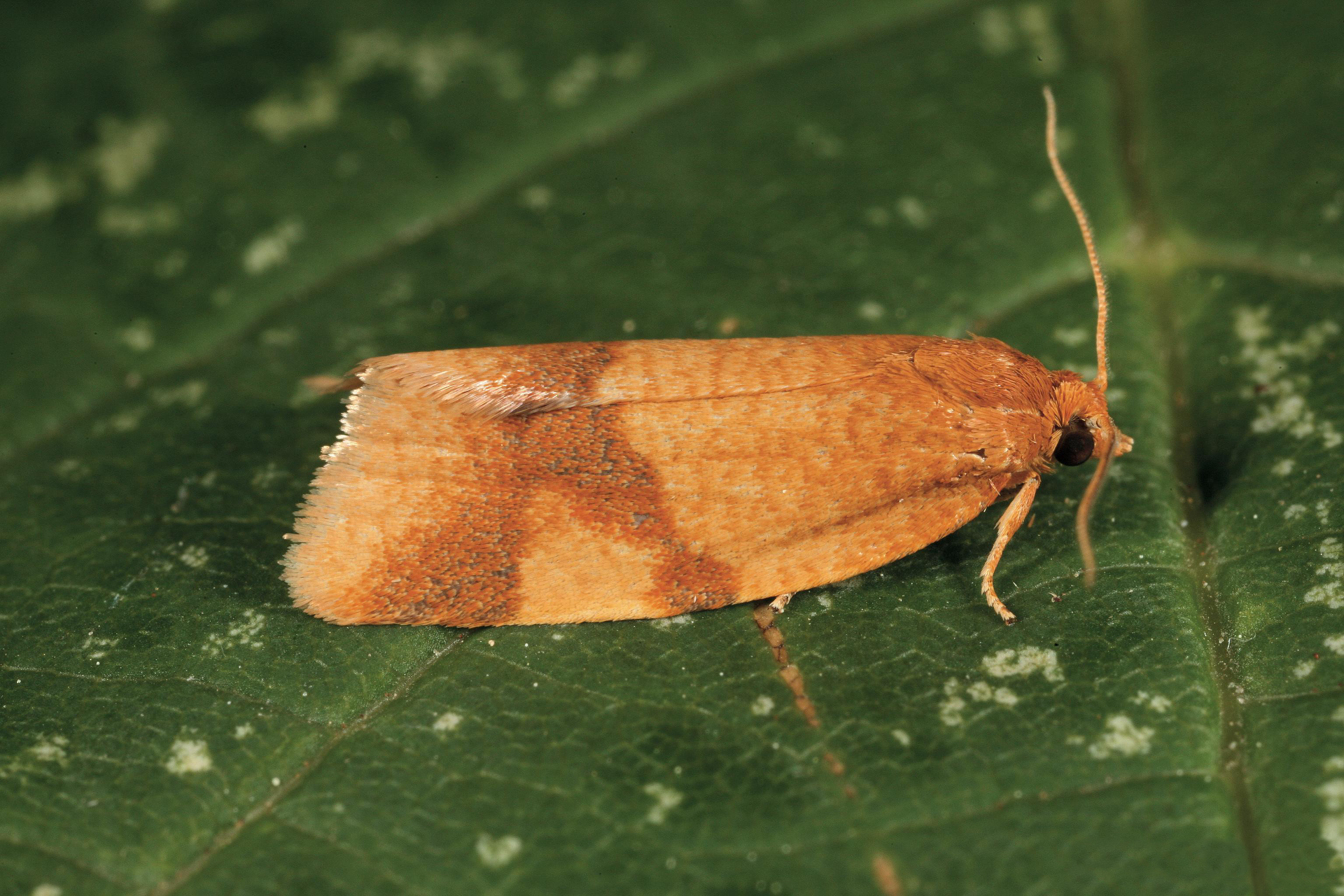

Scientific classification
- Kingdom: Animalia
- Phylum: Arthropoda
- Clade: Pancrustacea
- Class: Insecta
- Order: Lepidoptera
- Family: Tortricidae
- Genus: Aphelia
- Species: A. ferrugana

Binomial name
- Aphelia ferrugana (Hübner, 1793)

Synonyms
- Phalaena (Tortrix) ferrugana Hübner, 1793; Aphelia ferugana; Tortrix ochreana Hubner, [1796-1799]; Aphelia ochrana Hubner 1799; Aphelia amplana chretieni Obraztsov, 1957; Tortricomorpha shaqlawana Amsel, 1955

= Aphelia ferrugana =

Species of moth

Aphelia ferrugana is a species of moth of the family Tortricidae. It is found in central and south-eastern Europe, the south-eastern part of European Russia, Ukraine, the Caucasus, Asia Minor, Syria, Iraq and Iran.

The wingspan is 19–23 mm. Adults are on wing from May to the end of July in one generation per year.

The larvae feed on Pulsatilla, Anemone and Ononis species.
