= Aphelia polyglochina =

Scientific classification
- Kingdom: Animalia
- Phylum: Arthropoda
- Class: Insecta
- Order: Lepidoptera
- Family: Tortricidae
- Genus: Aphelia
- Species: A. polyglochina

Binomial name
- Aphelia polyglochina Razowski, 1981

Species of moth

Aphelia polyglochina is a species of moth of the family Tortricidae. It is found in Mongolia.
