= Aphelia stigmatana =

Scientific classification
- Domain: Eukaryota
- Kingdom: Animalia
- Phylum: Arthropoda
- Class: Insecta
- Order: Lepidoptera
- Family: Tortricidae
- Genus: Aphelia
- Species: A. stigmatana

Binomial name
- Aphelia stigmatana (Eversmann, 1844)

Synonyms
- Tortrix stigmatana Eversmann, 1844

Species of moth

Aphelia stigmatana is a species of moth of the family Tortricidae. It is found in Ukraine and the southern part of European Russia.

The wingspan is 22–32 mm.
