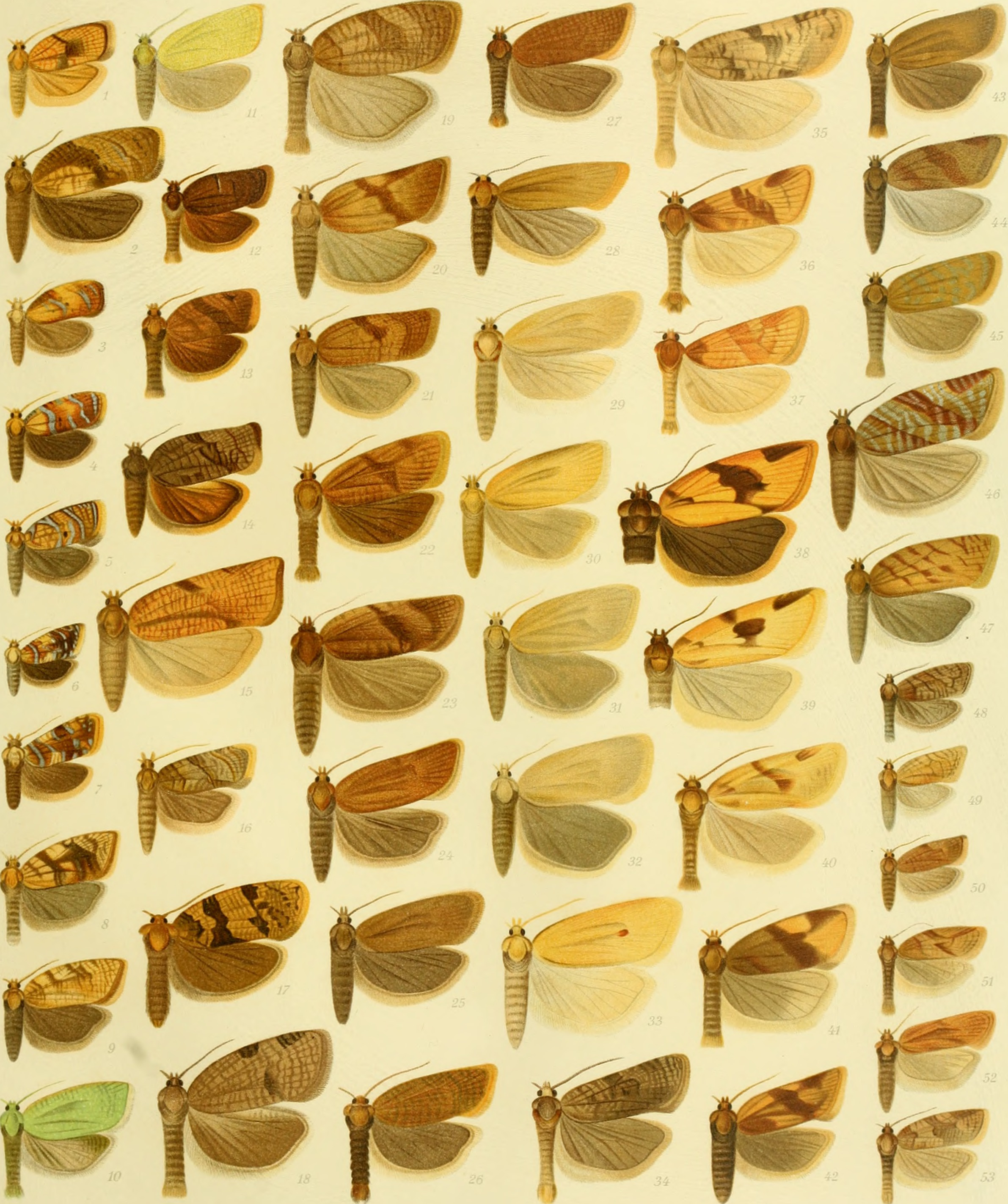
- Aphelia inumbratana in Kennel Die palaearktischen tortriciden figure 22 male, 23 female

Scientific classification
- Domain: Eukaryota
- Kingdom: Animalia
- Phylum: Arthropoda
- Class: Insecta
- Order: Lepidoptera
- Family: Tortricidae
- Genus: Aphelia
- Species: A. inumbratana

Binomial name
- Aphelia inumbratana (Christoph, 1881)

Synonyms
- Tortrix inumbratana Christoph, 1881

= Aphelia inumbratana =

Species of moth

Aphelia inumbratana is a species of moth of the family Tortricidae. It is found in the Russian Far East and Japan.

The wingspan is about 19 mm for males and 27 mm for females.

The larvae are polyphagous on Rosales and Asterales species, feeding on young buds and within rolled leaves. Pupation takes place in a rolled leaf.
