= Weismanniola =

Scientific classification
- Kingdom: Animalia
- Phylum: Arthropoda
- Class: Insecta
- Order: Lepidoptera
- Family: Sesiidae
- Tribe: Synanthedonini
- Genus: Weismanniola; Naumann, 1971
- Species: W. agdistiformis

Binomial name
- Weismanniola agdistiformis (Staudinger, 1866)

Synonyms
- Sesia agdistiformis Staudinger, 1866

Genus of moths

Weismanniola is a genus of moths in the family Sesiidae, containing only one species Weismanniola agdistiformis, which is found in southern Russia and western Kazakhstan.

The larvae possibly feed on Artemisia species.
