= Aphelia tshetverikovi =

Scientific classification
- Domain: Eukaryota
- Kingdom: Animalia
- Phylum: Arthropoda
- Class: Insecta
- Order: Lepidoptera
- Family: Tortricidae
- Genus: Aphelia
- Species: A. tshetverikovi

Binomial name
- Aphelia tshetverikovi Danilevsky, 1963

Species of moth

Aphelia tshetverikovi is a species of moth of the family Tortricidae. It is found in Russia, where it has been recorded from the north-western Caucasus.
