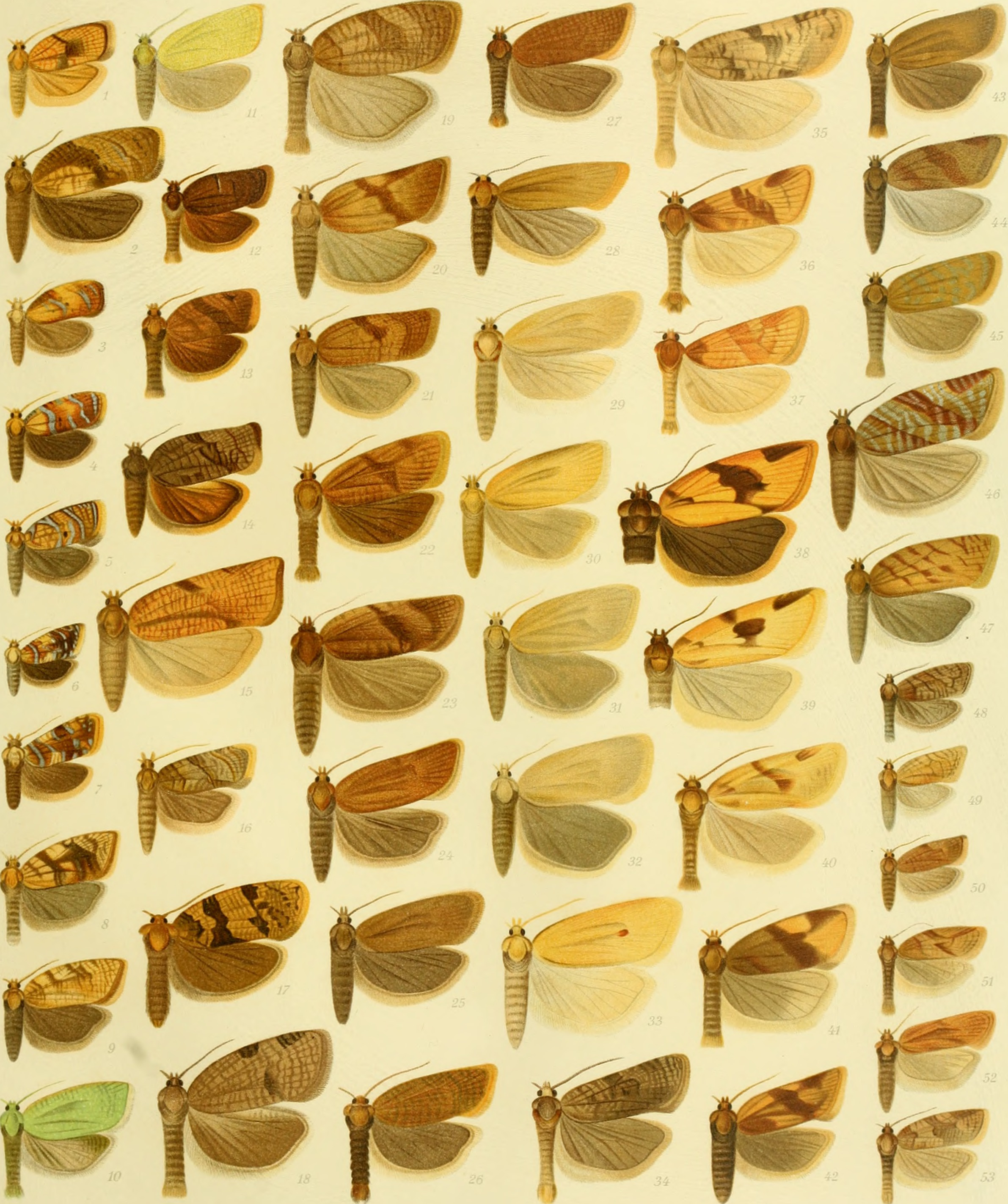
- Aphelia aglossana in Kennel Die palaearktischen tortriciden figure 34 male

Scientific classification
- Domain: Eukaryota
- Kingdom: Animalia
- Phylum: Arthropoda
- Class: Insecta
- Order: Lepidoptera
- Family: Tortricidae
- Genus: Aphelia
- Species: A. aglossana

Binomial name
- Aphelia aglossana (Kennel, 1899)

Synonyms
- Tortrix (Heterognomon) aglossana Kennel, 1899; Tortrix accuratana Kennel, 1901; Tortrix continentana Rebel, 1916; Tortrix continentana iliensis Rebel, 1916; Djakonovia scutellana Obraztsov, 1943

= Aphelia aglossana =

Species of moth

Aphelia aglossana is a species of moth of the family Tortricidae. It is found in Kazakhstan, Mongolia and Russia.
