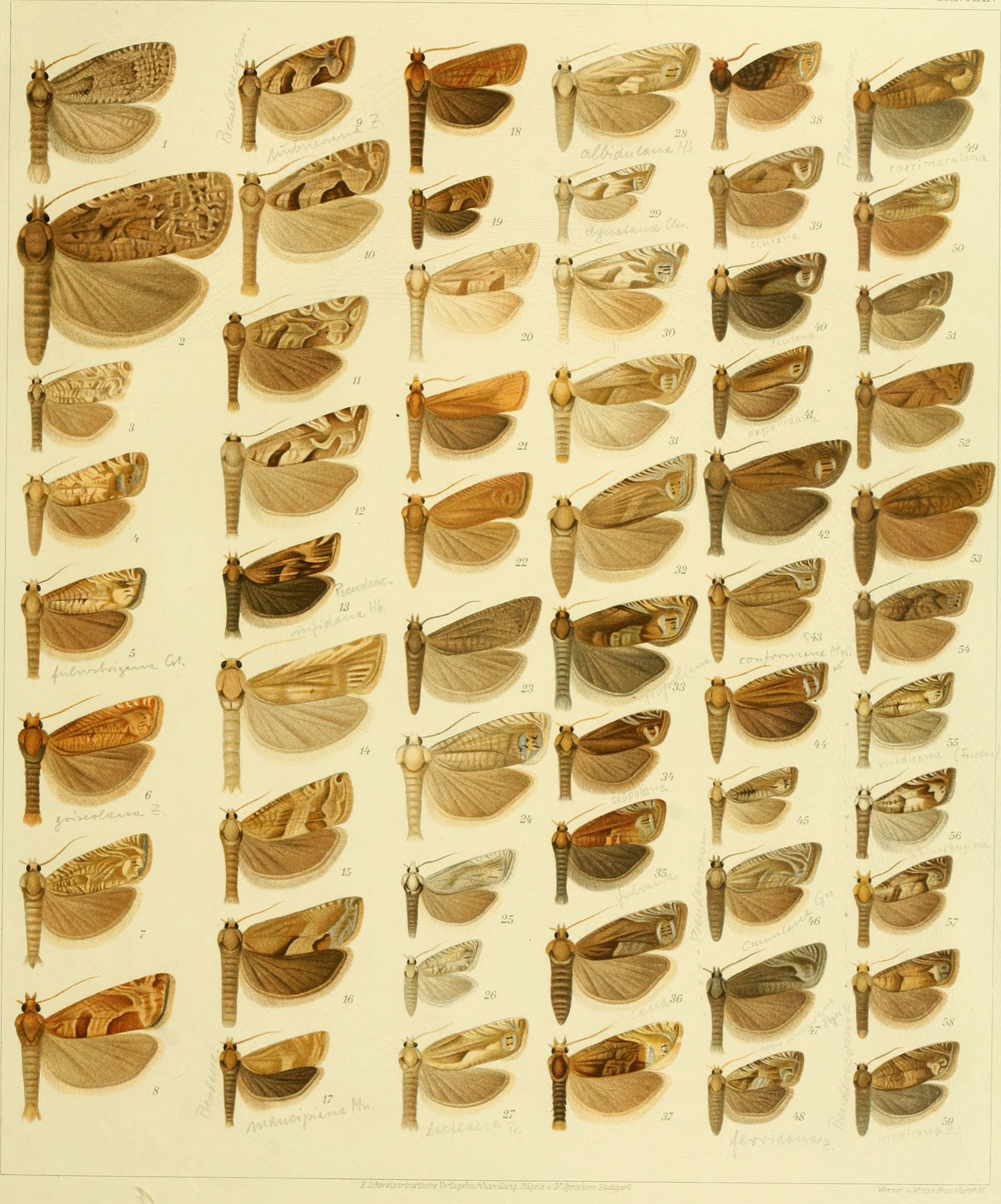
- Eucosma agnatana in Kennel Die palaearktischen tortriciden figure 29, 30 male

Scientific classification
- Kingdom: Animalia
- Phylum: Arthropoda
- Clade: Pancrustacea
- Class: Insecta
- Order: Lepidoptera
- Family: Tortricidae
- Genus: Eucosma
- Species: E. agnatana

Binomial name
- Eucosma agnatana (Christoph, 1872)

Synonyms
- Grapholitha agnatana Christoph, 1872; Eucosma agnathana Razowski, 1971

= Eucosma agnatana =

Species of moth

Eucosma agnatana is a species of moth of the family Tortricidae. It is found in China (Hebei, Shanxi, Inner Mongolia, Shaanxi, Qinghai), Mongolia, Russia, Kazakhstan, Romania, Russia and the Near East.

The wingspan is 13–17 mm. Adults are on wing from August to September.

The larvae feed on Artemisia fragrans, Artemisia nutans and Artemisia monogyna.
