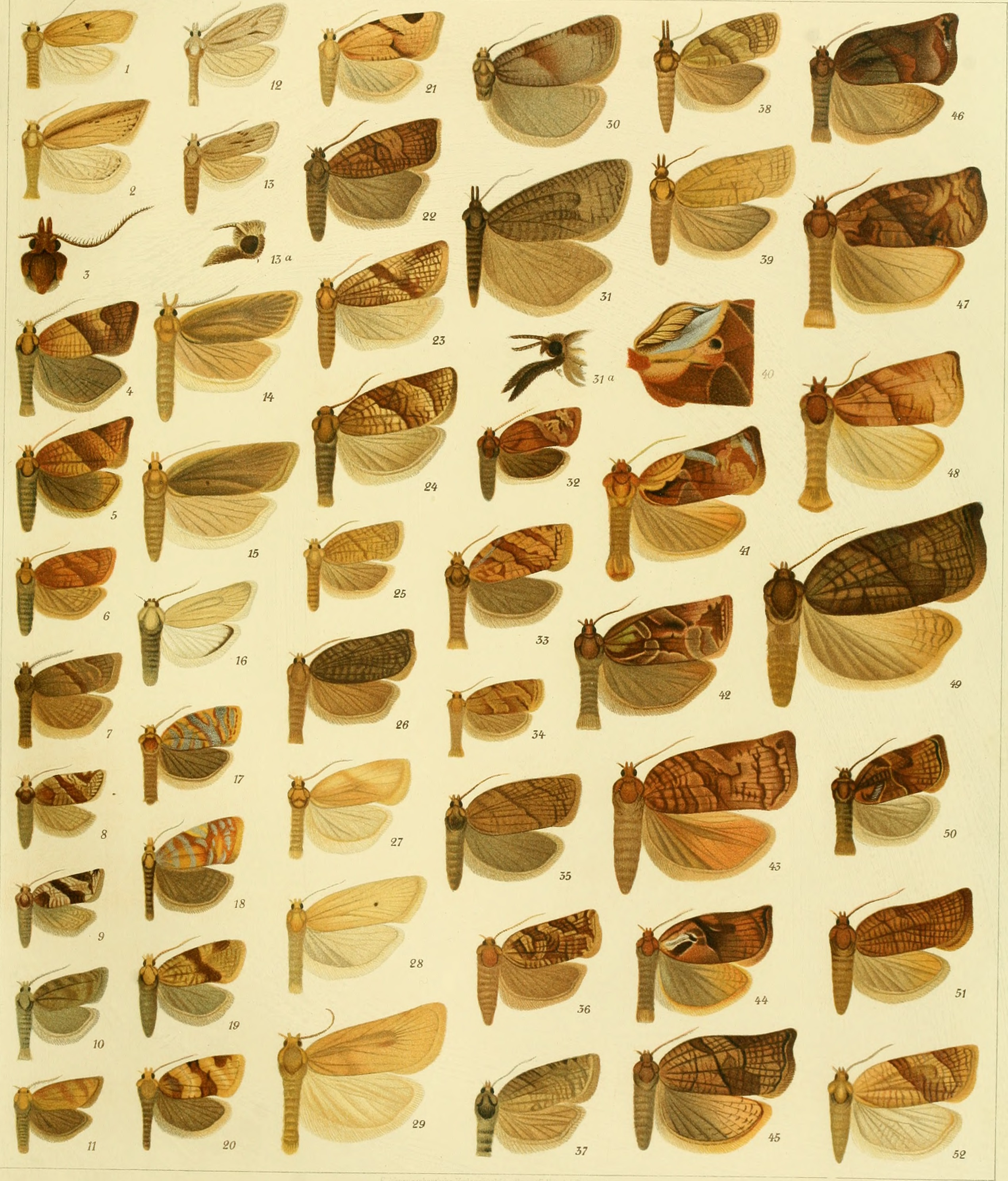
- Aphelia albociliana in Kennel Die palaearktischen tortriciden figure 16 male

Scientific classification
- Domain: Eukaryota
- Kingdom: Animalia
- Phylum: Arthropoda
- Class: Insecta
- Order: Lepidoptera
- Family: Tortricidae
- Genus: Aphelia
- Species: A. albociliana

Binomial name
- Aphelia albociliana (Herrich-Schaffer, 1851)

Synonyms
- Tortrix (Cochylis) albociliana Herrich-Schaffer, 1851

= Aphelia albociliana =

Species of moth

Aphelia albociliana is a species of moth of the family Tortricidae. It is found in Russia.

The wingspan is 14–20 mm. Adults have been recorded on wing from May to June.
