= Streltzoviella insularis =

Scientific classification
- Domain: Eukaryota
- Kingdom: Animalia
- Phylum: Arthropoda
- Class: Insecta
- Order: Lepidoptera
- Family: Cossidae
- Genus: Streltzoviella
- Species: S. insularis

Binomial name
- Streltzoviella insularis (Staudinger, 1892)

Synonyms
- Holcocerus arenicola var. insularis Staudinger, 1892; Cossus ussuriensis Graeser, 1892

Species of moth

Streltzoviella insularis is a moth in the family Cossidae. It is found in China (Heilongjiang, Liaoning, Hebei, Shandong, Anhui, Hunan, Fujian, Shanghai, Beijing, Shansi, Inner Mongolia), the southern Russian Far East, Korea and Japan. The habitat consists of nemoral forests at low elevations.

The length of the forewings is 16–19 mm. Adults are on wing from June to September.

== Subspecies ==
- Streltzoviella insularis insularis
- Streltzoviella insularis extrema Yakovlev, 2006 (central China)
