= Aphelia caucasica =

Scientific classification
- Domain: Eukaryota
- Kingdom: Animalia
- Phylum: Arthropoda
- Class: Insecta
- Order: Lepidoptera
- Family: Tortricidae
- Genus: Aphelia
- Species: A. caucasica

Binomial name
- Aphelia caucasica Kostyuk, 1975

Species of moth

Aphelia caucasica is a species of moth of the family Tortricidae. It is found in Russia, where it has been recorded from the Caucasus.
