= Aphelia caradjana =

Scientific classification
- Domain: Eukaryota
- Kingdom: Animalia
- Phylum: Arthropoda
- Class: Insecta
- Order: Lepidoptera
- Family: Tortricidae
- Genus: Aphelia
- Species: A. caradjana

Binomial name
- Aphelia caradjana (Caradja, 1916)

Synonyms
- Tortrix caradjana Caradja, 1916

Species of moth

Aphelia caradjana is a species of moth of the family Tortricidae. It is found in Russia, where it has been recorded from Khabarovsky Krai.
