= Cochylimorpha pyramidana =

Scientific classification
- Kingdom: Animalia
- Phylum: Arthropoda
- Clade: Pancrustacea
- Class: Insecta
- Order: Lepidoptera
- Family: Tortricidae
- Genus: Cochylimorpha
- Species: C. pyramidana

Binomial name
- Cochylimorpha pyramidana (Staudinger, 1871)

Synonyms
- Conchylis pyramidana Staudinger, 1871; Stenodes (Stenodes) pallens Kuznetzov, 1966; Cochylimorpha razowskiana Kuznetzov, 1966

Species of moth

Cochylimorpha pyramidana is a species of moth of the family Tortricidae. It is found in Spain, the Near East, Russia (Sarepta, Uralsk, Guberli), Armenia and Kazakhstan.

The wingspan is 16–19 mm. Adults have been recorded on wing from June to August.
