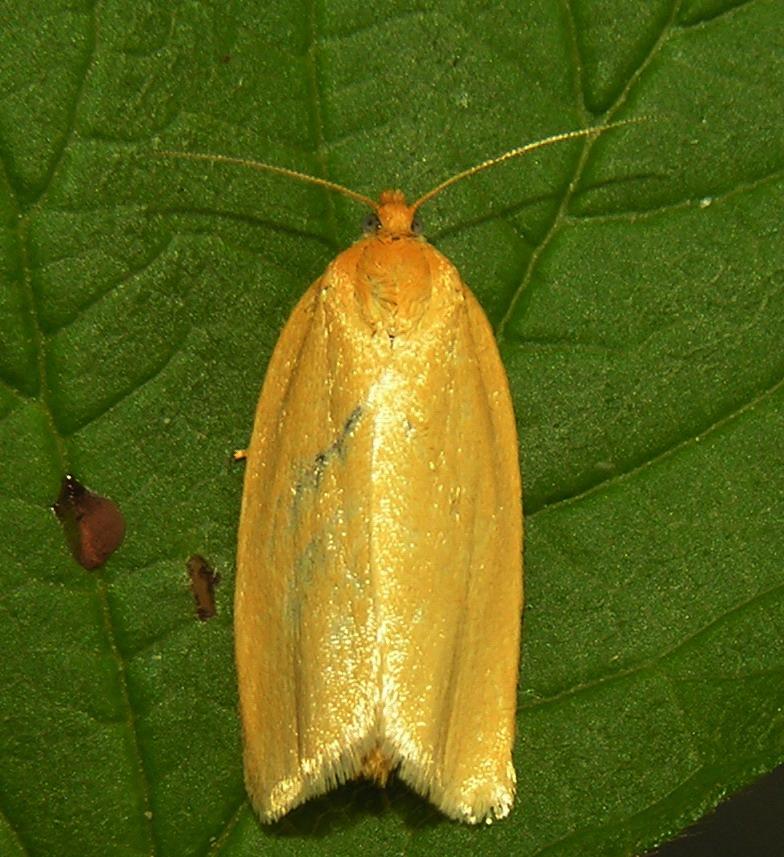

Scientific classification
- Kingdom: Animalia
- Phylum: Arthropoda
- Clade: Pancrustacea
- Class: Insecta
- Order: Lepidoptera
- Family: Tortricidae
- Genus: Aphelia
- Species: A. paleana

Binomial name
- Aphelia paleana (Hübner, 1793)

Synonyms
- List: Phalaena (Tortrix) paleana Hubner, 1793; Aphelia (Zelotherses) paleana; Tortrix flavana Hubner, [1796-1799]; Tortrix icterana Frolich, 1828; Tortrix paleana var. ictericana Kennel, 1910; Tortrix intermediana Herrich-Schaffer, 1856; Tortrix palleana Treitschke, 1830; Tortrix paleana raebeli Toll, 1951; Aphelia paleana ab. stenoptera Obraztsov, 1955

= Aphelia paleana =

Species of moth

Aphelia paleana, the timothy tortrix , is a moth of the family Tortricidae. It is found in Europe, and across the Palearctic to China (Heilongjiang, Beijing) and the Russian Far East.

The wingspan is 18–22 mm. The head and thorax are pale ferruginous. The forewings are narrowed anteriorly and whitish -ochreous or pale yellow -ochreous, sometimes greyish tinged, the base yellower. The hindwings are grey. The larva is blackish with large white spots; the head and thorax are black with white anterior edges. Julius von Kennel provides a full description.

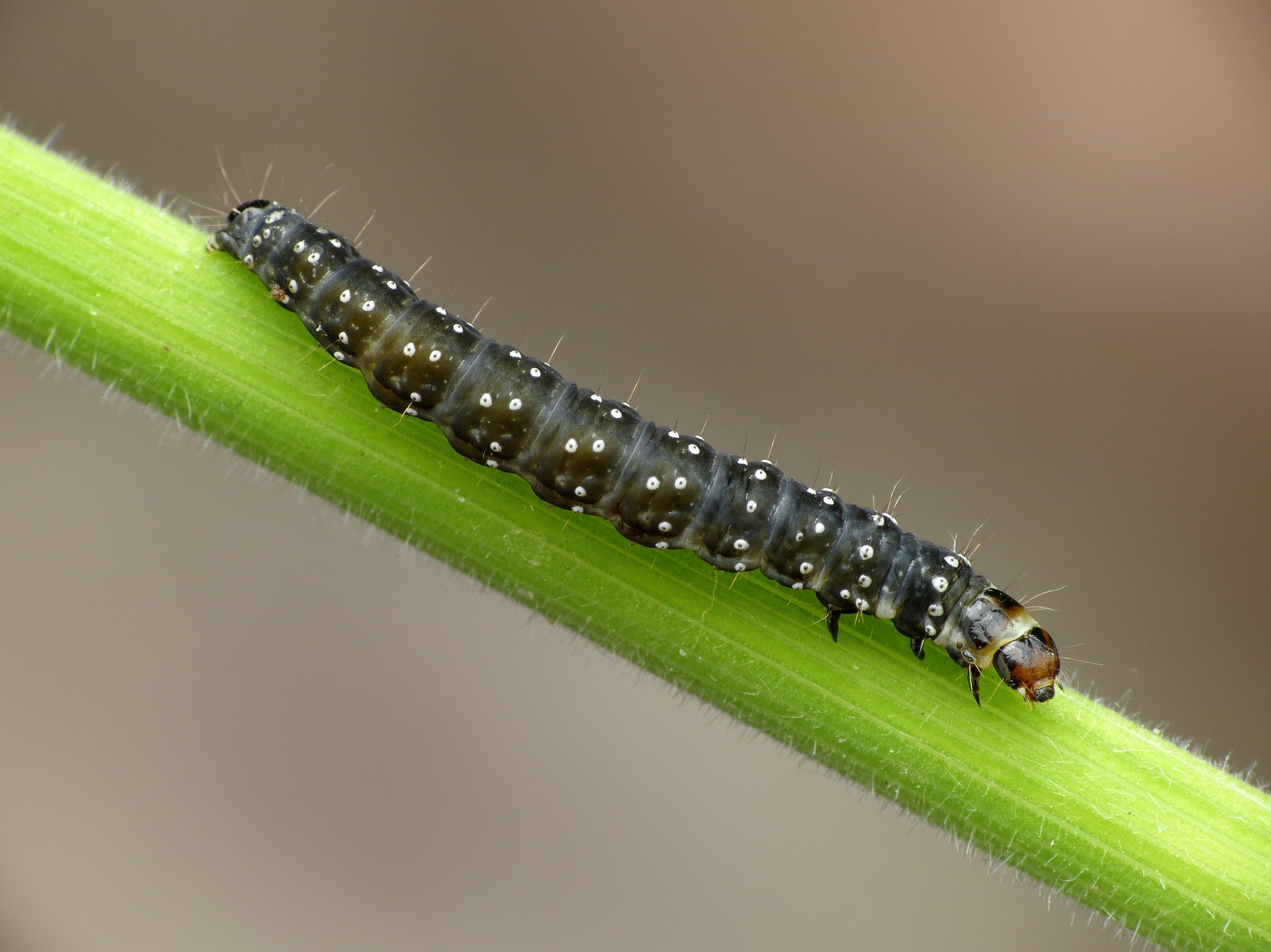
Aphelia paleana Larva

The moth flies from June to August in western Europe.

The larvae feed on various herbaceous plants such as Pulicaria dysenterica and wolfberry.
