= Grapholitini =

- Grapholitini sp.

Scientific classification
- Kingdom: Animalia
- Phylum: Arthropoda
- Class: Insecta
- Order: Lepidoptera
- Family: Tortricidae
- Subfamily: Olethreutinae
- Tribe: Grapholitini; Guenee, 1845

Genera
- See text

Synonyms
- Ephippiphorini Pierce & Metcalfe, 1922; Lipoptychini Pierce & Metcalfe, 1922; Laspeyresiini Heinrich, 1923

Tribe of tortrix moths

Grapholitini is a tribe of tortrix moths.

== Genera ==
Acanthoclita
Agriophanes
Andrioplecta
Apocydia
Archiphlebia
Articolla
Bhagwantolita
Centroxena
Commoneria
Coniostola
Corticivora
Cryptophlebia
Cryptoschesis
Cydia
Dichrorampha
Dierlia
Dracontogena
Ecdytolopha
Ethelgoda
Eucosmocydia
Fulcrifera
Goditha
Grapholita
Gymnandrosoma
Hyposarotis
Ixonympha
Karacaoglania
Larisa
Laspeyresinia
Lathronympha
Leguminivora
Licigena
Loranthacydia
Lusterala
Macrocydia
Matsumuraeses
Microsarotis
Muhabbetina
Multiquaestia
Notocydia
Ofatulena
Pammene
Pammenemima
Pammenitis
Pammenopsis
Parapammene
Parienia
Procoronis
Pseudogalleria
Pseudopammene
Ricula
Riculoides
Satronia
Selania
Sereda
Spanistoneura
Statignatha
Stephanopyga
Strophedra
Talponia
Thaumatotibia
Thaumatovalva
Thylacandra
Titanotoca
