= Lusterala =

Scientific classification
- Kingdom: Animalia
- Phylum: Arthropoda
- Class: Insecta
- Order: Lepidoptera
- Family: Tortricidae
- Genus: Lusterala; Brown & Nishida, 2007
- Species: L. phaseolana

Binomial name
- Lusterala phaseolana Brown & Nishida, 2007

Monotypic genus of tortrix moths

Lusterala is a monotypic, neotropical genus of tortix moths provisionally assigned to tribe Grapholitini of subfamily Olethreutinae, with Lusterala phaseolana as sole species.

Genus and species were both described in 2007 by John Wesley Brown and Kenji Nishida. The holotype is conserved at the National Museum of Natural History in Washington, DC. Based on DNA barcoding, the genus is possibly a synonym of Ecdytolopha.

== Behaviour and distribution ==
Lusterala phaseolana is known from Costa Rica. Its larvae are gall-inductive on the stems of their host plant, lima bean (Phaseolus lunatus L.).
