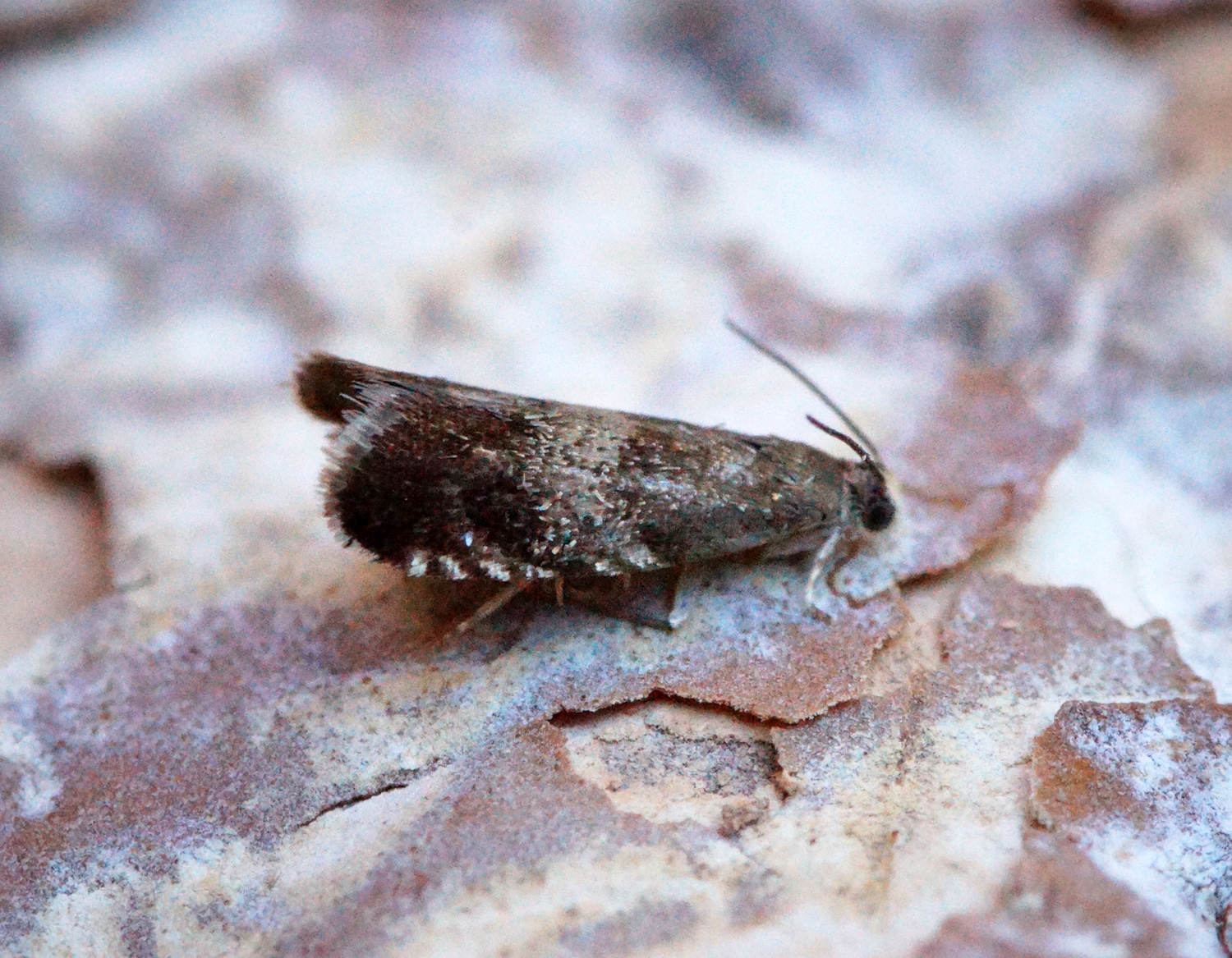

Scientific classification
- Kingdom: Animalia
- Phylum: Arthropoda
- Class: Insecta
- Order: Lepidoptera
- Family: Tortricidae
- Genus: Strophedra
- Species: S. nitidana

Binomial name
- Strophedra nitidana (Fabricius, 1794)

= Strophedra nitidana =

Species of moth

Strophedra nitidana is a moth belonging to the family Tortricidae first described by Johan Christian Fabricius in 1794.

It is native to the Palearctic.

The wingspan is 9-10 mm. It is similar to the closely related Strophedra weirana but has somewhat clearer markings. The forewings are quite narrow and have a bright, V-shaped cross-band with a narrow brown middle section approximately mid-stripe, besides some small, bright spots at the costal edge.

The larvae develop on oak (Quercus spp.) where they spin two leaves together with silk and live between them. They eventually gnaw out "windows" in the leaves. The moths fly in May-June, preferably during the day.
