= Pammenemima ochropa =

Scientific classification
- Kingdom: Animalia
- Phylum: Arthropoda
- Clade: Pancrustacea
- Class: Insecta
- Order: Lepidoptera
- Family: Tortricidae
- Genus: Pammenemima
- Species: P. ochropa

Binomial name
- Pammenemima ochropa (Meyrick, 1905)

Synonyms
- Lipoptycha ochropa Meyrick, 1905; Laspeyresia ochropa Meyrick, 1907; Laspeyresia dissios Meyrick, 1907

Species of moth

Pammenemima ochropa is a moth of the family Tortricidae first described by Edward Meyrick in 1905. It is found in Sri Lanka and its Barberyn Island.

The wingspan of the female is 9.5 mm. Its head is fuscous. Thorax, forehead and face are whitish ochreous. Antenna dark fuscous. Palpus white. Abdomen pale grey fuscous with silvery-white venter. Forewing deep fuscous purple. They are oblong subtruncate, moderately broad with curved costa. Apex rounded. Costa from beyond base to before middle with three black oblique short streaks, alternating with four light grey marks. A large black median spot present. Costa suffused with black grey beyond base to apex which contain three pale grey oblique marks before middle, and four silvery-white metallic crescent-shaped marks along about three-fourths of the costa. There are two faint small pale marks runs before apex. The fourth white costal mark emitting a second blue line. Cilia glossy light fuscous grey, with strong prismatic reflections. Hindwings fuscous purplish. Cilia light fuscous grey, with a purplish base and a faint paler submedian band.

Its larval host plant is Desmodium.
