= Thylacandra =

Scientific classification
- Kingdom: Animalia
- Phylum: Arthropoda
- Class: Insecta
- Order: Lepidoptera
- Family: Tortricidae
- Tribe: Grapholitini
- Genus: Thylacandra; Diakonoff, 1963

Genus of tortrix moths

Thylacandra is a genus of moths belonging to the subfamily Olethreutinae of the family Tortricidae.

== Species ==
- Thylacandra argyromixtana (Mabille, 1900)
- Thylacandra endotera Diakonoff, 1983
- Thylacandra malagassana (Saalmuller, 1880)
- Thylacandra melanotoma Diakonoff, 1983
- Thylacandra sycophyes Diakonoff, 1970

== See also ==
- List of Tortricidae genera
