= Acanthoclita balanoptycha =

Scientific classification
- Kingdom: Animalia
- Phylum: Arthropoda
- Class: Insecta
- Order: Lepidoptera
- Family: Tortricidae
- Genus: Acanthoclita
- Species: A. balanoptycha

Binomial name
- Acanthoclita balanoptycha (Meyrick, 1910)

Synonyms
- Eucosma balanoptycha Meyrick, 1910

Moth in the family Tortricidae from tropical Asia

Acanthoclita balanoptycha is a moth of the family Tortricidae first described by Edward Meyrick in 1910. It is found in the tropical areas of India, Sri Lanka, Malaysia and Micronesia.

Larval food plants are Butea monosperma, Millettia pinnata, Derris elliptica, Derris malaccensis, Millettia auriculata and Ehretia species.
