= Talponia =

Scientific classification
- Kingdom: Animalia
- Phylum: Arthropoda
- Class: Insecta
- Order: Lepidoptera
- Family: Tortricidae
- Tribe: Grapholitini
- Genus: Talponia; Heinrich, 1926

Genus of tortrix moths

Talponia is a genus of moths belonging to the family Tortricidae.

== Species ==
- Talponia batesi Heinrich, 1932
- Talponia plummeriana (Busck, 1906)

== See also ==
- List of Tortricidae genera
