= Licigena =

Scientific classification
- Domain: Eukaryota
- Kingdom: Animalia
- Phylum: Arthropoda
- Class: Insecta
- Order: Lepidoptera
- Family: Tortricidae
- Subfamily: Olethreutinae
- Tribe: Grapholitini
- Genus: Licigena; Diakonoff, 1982
- Species: L. sertula

Binomial name
- Licigena sertula Diakonoff, 1982

Monotypic genus of tortrix moths

Licigena is a monotypic genus of moths belonging to the subfamily Olethreutinae of the family Tortricidae. Its sole species is Licigena sertula, which has been found in Sri Lanka. Both the genus and species were first described by Alexey Diakonoff in 1982.

== Description ==
The wingspan of the male is 11.5 mm is and female is 11 mm. Head ash gray. Tuft on forehead mixed with black. Antenna dark gray. Palpus white. Thorax gray, with whitish edges of scales. Abdomen gray with a golden gloss. Forewing oblong suboval, with curved costa. Apex broadly rounded. Termen rounded and oblique. Forewings grayish, with a faint bluish sheen. Markings are fuscous. Cilia light ash gray, with a darker subapical line. Hindwings dark fuscous purple. Cilia whitish, with a purple basal band.

== See also ==
- List of Tortricidae genera
