= Articolla cyclidias =

Scientific classification
- Kingdom: Animalia
- Phylum: Arthropoda
- Class: Insecta
- Order: Lepidoptera
- Family: Tortricidae
- Genus: Articolla
- Species: A. cyclidias

Binomial name
- Articolla cyclidias Meyrick, 1907

Species of moth

Articolla cyclidias is a moth of the family Tortricidae first described by Edward Meyrick in 1907. It is found in Sri Lanka.
