= Microsarotis samaruana =

Scientific classification
- Kingdom: Animalia
- Phylum: Arthropoda
- Class: Insecta
- Order: Lepidoptera
- Family: Tortricidae
- Genus: Microsarotis
- Species: M. samaruana

Binomial name
- Microsarotis samaruana Razowski, 2013

Species of moth

Microsarotis samaruana is a moth of the family Tortricidae. It is found in Nigeria.

The wingspan is about 9 mm.

== Etymology ==
The species name refers to Samaru, the type locality.
