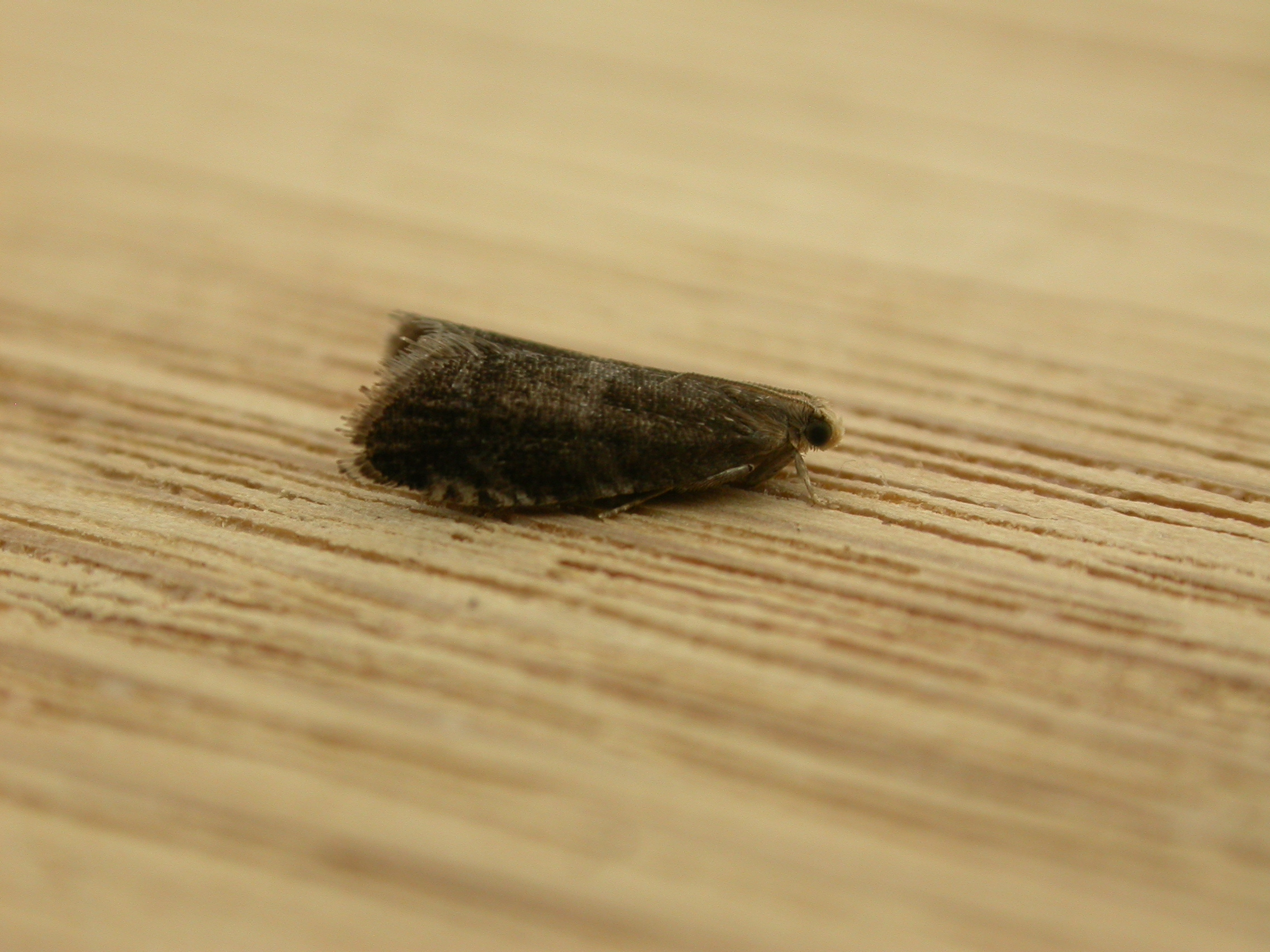
- Strophedra weirana

Scientific classification
- Kingdom: Animalia
- Phylum: Arthropoda
- Class: Insecta
- Order: Lepidoptera
- Family: Tortricidae
- Tribe: Grapholitini
- Genus: Strophedra; Herrich-Schäffer, 1853

= Strophedra =

Genus of tortrix moths

Strophedra is a genus of moths belonging to the subfamily Olethreutinae of the family Tortricidae.

== Species ==
- Strophedra dicastica (Meyrick, 1922)
- Strophedra graphologa (Diakonoff, 1976)
- Strophedra homotorna (Meyrick, 1912)
- Strophedra magna Komai, 1999
- Strophedra mica (Diakonoff, 1976)
- Strophedra nitidana (Fabricius, 1794)
- Strophedra pericapna (Diakonoff, 1976)
- Strophedra quercivora (Meyrick, 1920)
- Strophedra weirana (Douglas, 1850)

== See also ==
- List of Tortricidae genera
