= Procoronis swinhoeiana =

Scientific classification
- Kingdom: Animalia
- Phylum: Arthropoda
- Class: Insecta
- Order: Lepidoptera
- Family: Tortricidae
- Genus: Procoronis
- Species: P. swinhoeiana

Binomial name
- Procoronis swinhoeiana (Walsingham, in C. Swinhoe, 1890)

Synonyms
- Grapholitha swinhoeiana Walsingham, in C. Swinhoe, 1890; Procoronis rhothias Meyrick, 1911; Procoronis swinhoeana Diakonoff, 1949

Species of moth

Procoronis swinhoeiana is a species of moth of the family Tortricidae first described by Lord Walsingham in 1890. It is found on Seram and the Moluccas and in Myanmar and New Caledonia. The habitat consists of bamboo and secondary forests.
