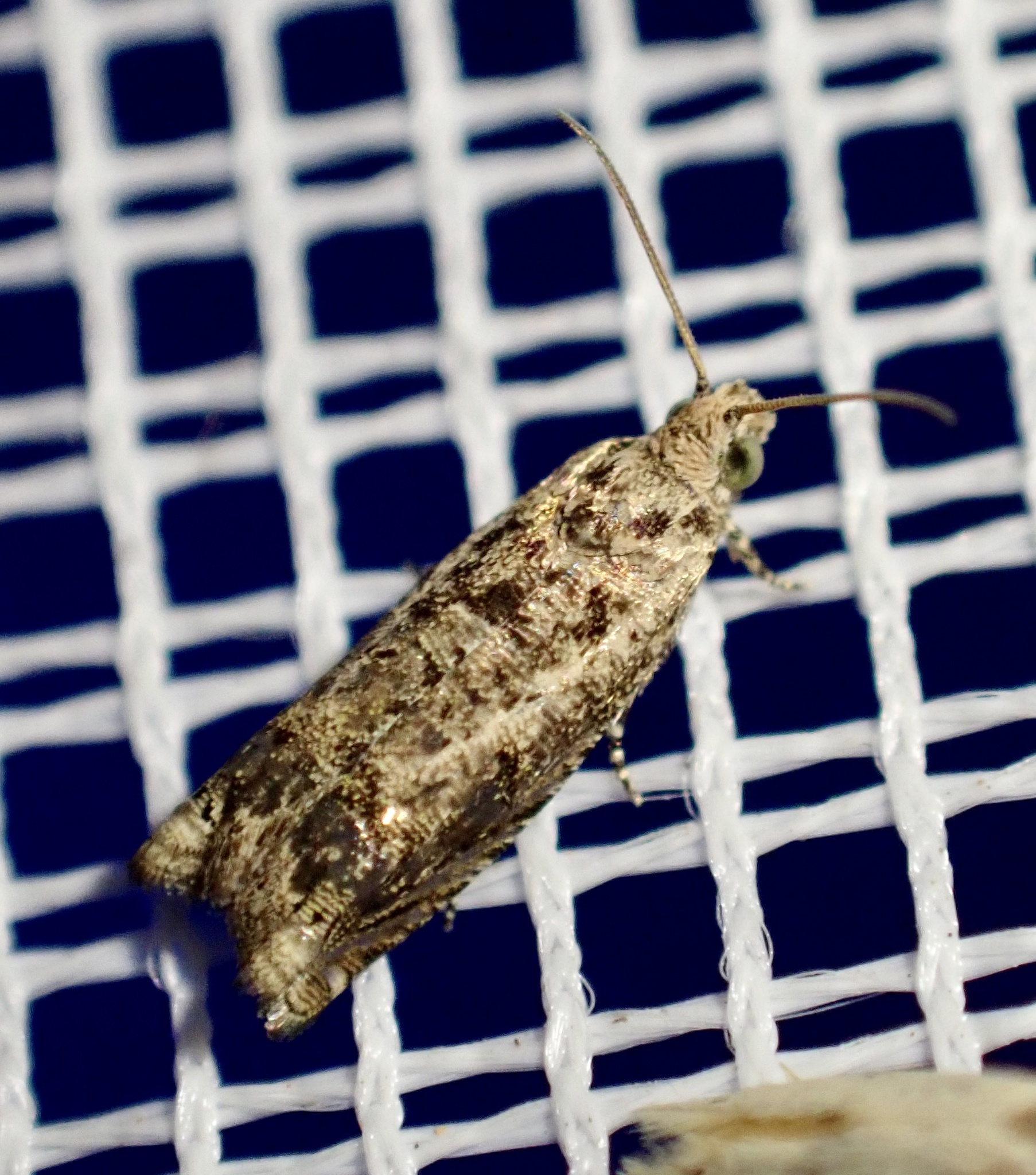
- Coniostola stereoma, Cape Verde

Scientific classification
- Kingdom: Animalia
- Phylum: Arthropoda
- Class: Insecta
- Order: Lepidoptera
- Family: Tortricidae
- Subfamily: Olethreutinae
- Tribe: Grapholitini
- Genus: Coniostola; Diakonoff, 1961

Type species
- Eucosma stereoma Meyrick, 1912

= Coniostola =

Genus of tortrix moths

Coniostola is a genus of moths belonging to the subfamily Olethreutinae of the family Tortricidae.

== Species ==
These 12 species belong to the genus Coniostola:

- Coniostola cinereocostalis Razowski & Bassi, 2018 (Gabon)
- Coniostola flavitinctana Agassiz & Aarvik, 2014 (Kenya, South Africa, Tanzania)
- Coniostola isabelae Razowski & Landry, 2008
- Coniostola laikipiana Agassiz & Aarvik, 2014 (Kenya)
- Coniostola lobostola (Meyrick, 1918) (Mozambique, South Africa)
- Coniostola procellosa (Meyrick, 1917)
- Coniostola rufitinctana Agassiz & Aarvik, 2014 (Kenya)
- Coniostola seira Razowski & Wojtusiak, 2012 (Gabon, Nigeria)
- Coniostola separata Razowski & Trematerra, 2010 (Ethiopia)
- Coniostola solivaga Razowski & Wojtusiak, 2012 (Nigeria)
- Coniostola stereoma (Meyrick, 1912) (Africa, Southern Asia)
- Coniostola symbola (Meyrick, 1909) (South Africa)
