= Matsumuraeses trophiodes =

Scientific classification
- Kingdom: Animalia
- Phylum: Arthropoda
- Class: Insecta
- Order: Lepidoptera
- Family: Tortricidae
- Genus: Matsumuraeses
- Species: M. trophiodes

Binomial name
- Matsumuraeses trophiodes (Meyrick, 1908)

Synonyms
- Eucosma trophiodes Meyrick, 1908; Argyroploce trophiodes T. B. Fletcher, 1932; Olethreutes trophiodes Clarke, 1958; Matsumuraeses phaseoli Obraztsov, i960; Matsumuraeses trophiodes Razowski & Yasuda, 1975

Species of moth

Matsumuraeses trophiodes is a moth of the family Tortricidae first described by Edward Meyrick in 1908. It is found in Sri Lanka and Java. The species sometimes considered as a synonym of Matsumuraeses phaseoli, which is found in China and South Africa.

Its larval host plant is Glycine max.
