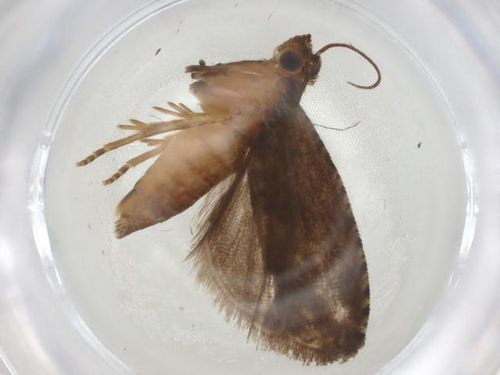

Scientific classification
- Kingdom: Animalia
- Phylum: Arthropoda
- Class: Insecta
- Order: Lepidoptera
- Family: Tortricidae
- Tribe: Grapholitini
- Genus: Acanthoclita; Diakonoff, 1982

= Acanthoclita =

Genus of tortrix moths

Acanthoclita is a genus of tortrix moths belonging to the subfamily Olethreutinae and tribe Grapholitini. It was established in 1982 by Alexey Diakonoff.

== Species ==
As of November 2019, the Online World Catalogue of the Tortricidae listed the following species:

- Acanthoclita acrocroca Diakonoff, 1982
- Acanthoclita argyrotorna (Diakonoff, 1984)
- Acanthoclita balanoptycha (Meyrick, 1910)
- Acanthoclita balia Diakonoff, 1982
- Acanthoclita bidenticulana (Bradley, 1957)
- Acanthoclita conciliata (Meyrick, 1920)
- Acanthoclita dejiciens (Meyrick, 1932)
- Acanthoclita expulsa Razowski, 2016
- Acanthoclita hilarocrossa (Meyrick, in de Joannis, 1930)
- Acanthoclita iridorphna (Meyrick, 1936)
- Acanthoclita pectinata (Diakonoff, 1988)
- Acanthoclita phaulomorpha (Meyrick, 1927)
- Acanthoclita trichograpta (Meyrick, 1911)

== See also ==
- List of Tortricidae genera
