= Parapammene dyserasta =

Scientific classification
- Kingdom: Animalia
- Phylum: Arthropoda
- Class: Insecta
- Order: Lepidoptera
- Family: Tortricidae
- Genus: Parapammene
- Species: P. dyserasta

Binomial name
- Parapammene dyserasta (Turner, 1916)

Synonyms
- Laspeyresia dyserasta Turner, 1916

Species of moth

Parapammene dyserasta is a species of moth of the family Tortricidae. It is found in Australia, where it has been recorded from Queensland.

The wingspan is about 9 mm. The forewings are fuscous, with a suffused whitish spot in the disc and a series of whitish costal strigulae (fine streaks). There is a dark-fuscous line from the midcosta, preceded and followed by dull bluish-metallic lines. The hindwings are fuscous.
