= Acanthoclita iridorphna =

Scientific classification
- Kingdom: Animalia
- Phylum: Arthropoda
- Class: Insecta
- Order: Lepidoptera
- Family: Tortricidae
- Genus: Acanthoclita
- Species: A. iridorphna

Binomial name
- Acanthoclita iridorphna Meyrick, 1936

Moth of the family Tortricidae from Sri Lanka and Taiwan

Acanthoclita iridorphna is a moth of the family Tortricidae first described by Edward Meyrick in 1936. It is found in Sri Lanka and Taiwan.

Males have a wingspan of 12–13 mm (0.47–0.51 in).
