= Satronia =

Scientific classification
- Kingdom: Animalia
- Phylum: Arthropoda
- Class: Insecta
- Order: Lepidoptera
- Family: Tortricidae
- Tribe: Grapholitini
- Genus: Satronia; Heinrich, 1926

Genus of tortrix moths

Satronia is a New World genus of tortrix moths belonging to the subfamily Olethreutinae and tribe Grapholitini. The genus was erected in 1926 by Carl Heinrich and was previously considered monotypic. Its type species is Satronia tantilla.

== Appearance ==
Józef Razowski and Vitor O. Becker (2016) described the genus as

characterized by a slender forewing, usually simple markings and the lack of a terminal row of dots on the forewing. There are usually some strigulae and dots in the subterminal fascia, and the costal half of the median fascia is well developed, often extending near the middle of the median cell posteriorly.

—

== Distribution ==
Species from this genus are known to occur in Florida, Costa Rica, and Brazil. Specimens have been collected at altitudes ranging from 5 to 1100 meter.

== Species ==
The genus consists of the following thirteen species, listed alphabetically:

- Satronia catharma Razowski & Becker, 2016
- Satronia herediae Razowski, 2011
- Satronia laepha Razowski & Becker, 2016
- Satronia lita Razowski & Becker, 2016
- Satronia mantissa Razowski & Becker, 2016
- Satronia mesaea Razowski & Becker, 2016
- Satronia pentha Razowski & Becker, 2016
- Satronia pheidologeton Razowski & Becker, 2016
- Satronia priva Razowski & Becker, 2016
- Satronia selvae Razowski, 2011
- Satronia sesops Razowski & Becker, 2016
- Satronia sinuata Razowski & Becker, 2016
- Satronia tantilla Heinrich, 1926

== See also ==
- List of Tortricidae genera
