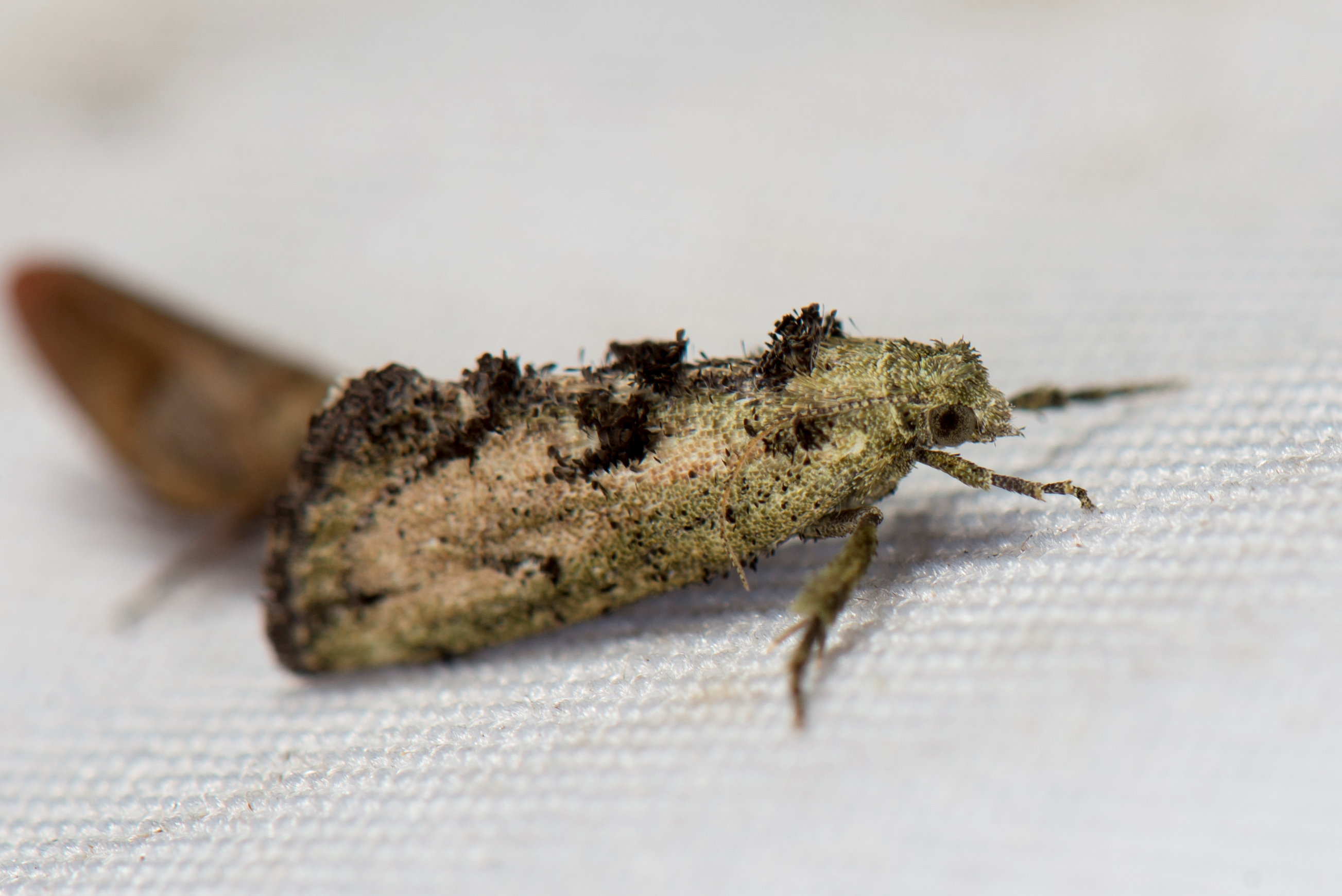
- Matsumuraeses sp.

Scientific classification
- Kingdom: Animalia
- Phylum: Arthropoda
- Class: Insecta
- Order: Lepidoptera
- Family: Tortricidae
- Subfamily: Olethreutinae
- Tribe: Grapholitini
- Genus: Matsumuraeses; Issiki, 1957

= Matsumuraeses =

Genus of tortrix moths

Matsumuraeses is a genus of moths belonging to the subfamily Olethreutinae of the family Tortricidae.

== Species ==
- Matsumuraeses acrocosma Diakonoff, 1971
- Matsumuraeses azukivora (Matsumura, 1910)
- Matsumuraeses capax Razowski & Yasuda, 1975
- Matsumuraeses elpisma Diakonoff, 1972
- Matsumuraeses falcana (Walsingham, 1900)
- Matsumuraeses felix Diakonoff, 1972
- Matsumuraeses melanaula (Meyrick, 1916)
- Matsumuraeses ochreocervina (Walsingham, 1900)
- Matsumuraeses patialaensis Rose & Pooni, 2003
- Matsumuraeses phaseoli (Matsumura, 1900)
- Matsumuraeses tetramorpha Diakonoff, 1972
- Matsumuraeses trophiodes (Meyrick, 1908)
- Matsumuraeses ussuriensis (Caradja, 1916)
- Matsumuraeses vicina Kuznetzov, 1973
- Matsumuraeses xantholoba Diakonoff, 1972

== See also ==
- List of Tortricidae genera
