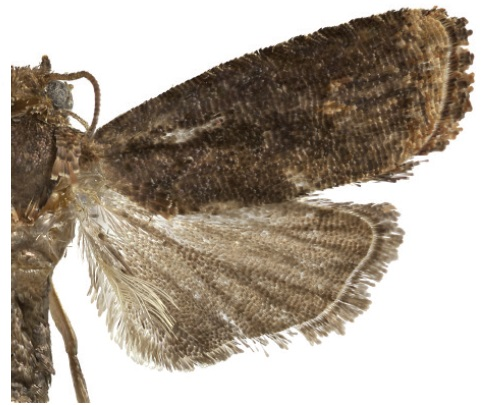
- Upperside
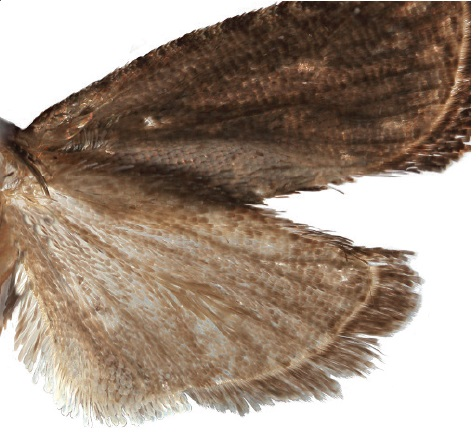
- Underside

Scientific classification
- Kingdom: Animalia
- Phylum: Arthropoda
- Class: Insecta
- Order: Lepidoptera
- Family: Tortricidae
- Genus: Thaumatovalva
- Species: T. limbata

Binomial name
- Thaumatovalva limbata (Diakonoff, 1969)

Synonyms
- Grapholita limbata Diakonoff, 1969

= Thaumatovalva limbata =

Species of moth

Thaumatovalva limbata is a species of moth of the family Tortricidae first described by Alexey Diakonoff in 1969. It is found on the Seychelles (Praslin, Cosmoledo and Mahé islands) and in Kenya.

The length of the forewings is 5–6 mm for males and 6–8 mm for females. The forewings are dark brown, irregularly and faintly mixed with specks of charcoal, rust and cream. There is an inconspicuous pair of tiny cream dots ringed with orange near the distal end of the discal cell, as well as a narrow cream irregular band extending along the termen. The hindwings are nearly uniform greyish brown.

The larvae feed on the fruit of Cordia somaliensis and Cordia monoica.
