= Titanotoca =

Scientific classification
- Kingdom: Animalia
- Phylum: Arthropoda
- Class: Insecta
- Order: Lepidoptera
- Family: Tortricidae
- Tribe: Grapholitini
- Genus: Titanotoca; Diakonoff, 1984

Genus of tortrix moths

Titanotoca is a genus of moths belonging to the subfamily Olethreutinae of the family Tortricidae.

== Species ==
- Titanotoca pagerostoma Diakonoff, 1984

== See also ==
- List of Tortricidae genera
