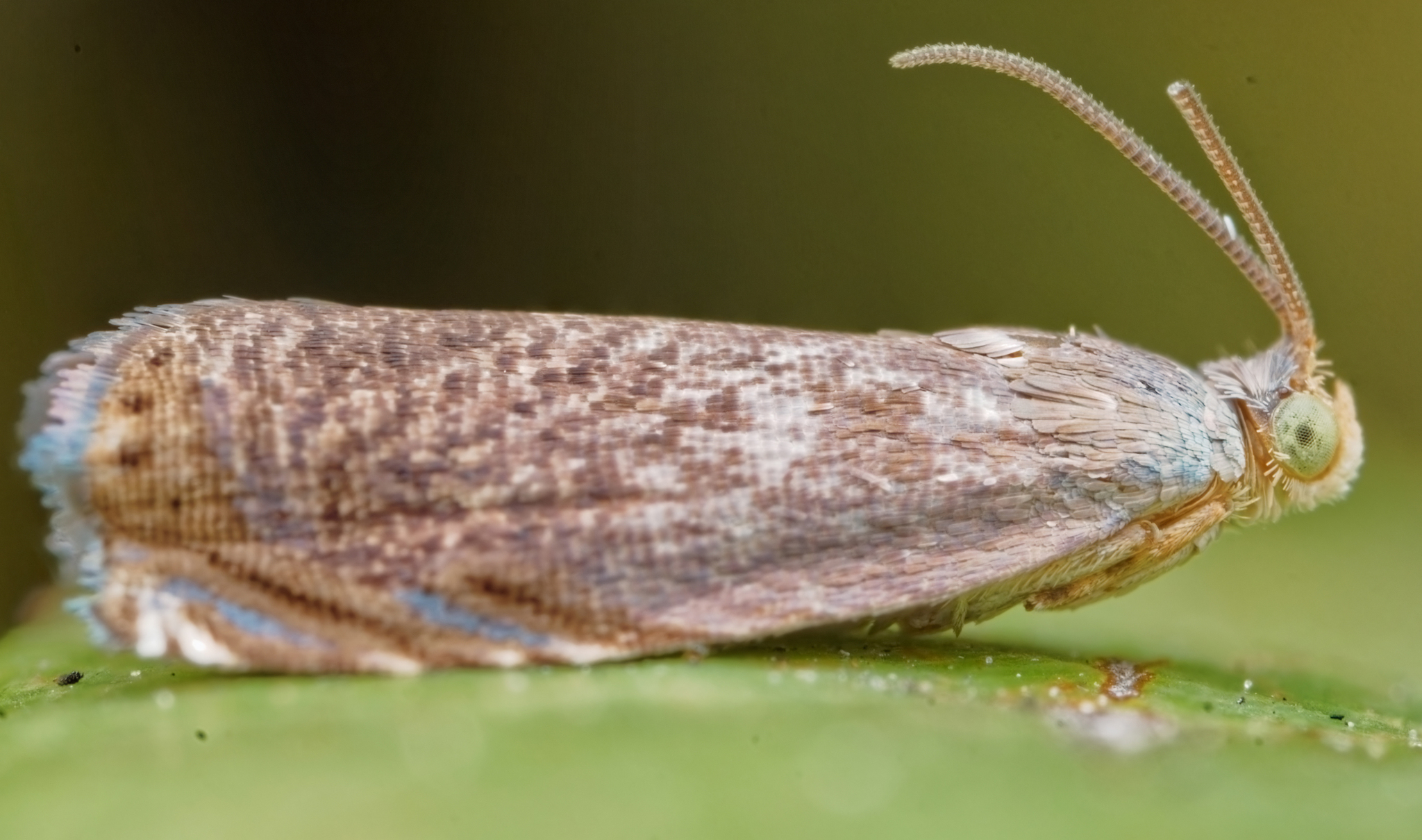

Scientific classification
- Kingdom: Animalia
- Phylum: Arthropoda
- Class: Insecta
- Order: Lepidoptera
- Family: Tortricidae
- Genus: Commoneria
- Species: C. sinuata

Binomial name
- Commoneria sinuata (Pinkaew, Muadsub & Jaikla, 2022)

= Commoneria sinuata =

Species of moth

Commoneria sinuata is a moth of the family Tortricidae. It is found in Thailand, and as an introduced species in Hawaiʻi.

It can be distinguished from other species in the genus Commoneria by its strongly sinuate outer edge of the male hindwing.

The wingspan is 11–18 mm. The frons show pale yellowish tones on the lower portion, graduating to light brown above. The top of the head (vertex) is brown and becomes iridescent when viewed at an angle. The labial palps are thrust forward: the basal segment is pale, the second curved and slightly broadened medially and darker toward the tip, while the terminal segment is short and narrow. The antennae are brown and reach approximately halfway along the forewing.
