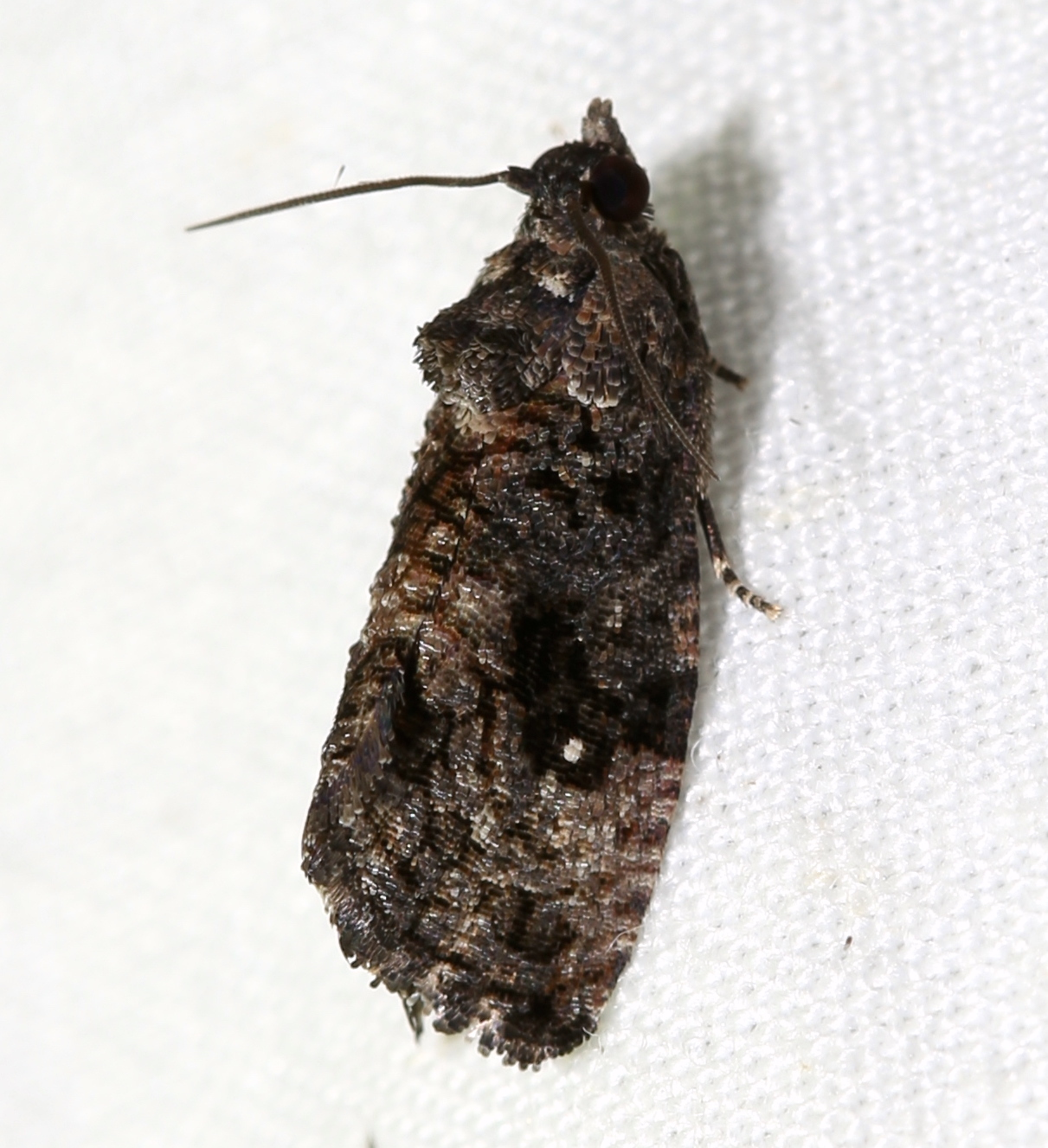

Scientific classification
- Kingdom: Animalia
- Phylum: Arthropoda
- Class: Insecta
- Order: Lepidoptera
- Family: Tortricidae
- Genus: Gymnandrosoma
- Species: G. punctidiscanum

Binomial name
- Gymnandrosoma punctidiscanum Dyar, 1904

Synonyms
- Ecdytolopha punctidiscana; Cydia punctidiscana

= Gymnandrosoma punctidiscanum =

Species of moth

Gymnandrosoma punctidiscanum, the dotted ecdytolopha moth, is a moth of the family Tortricidae. It is found in North America, where it has been recorded from Alabama, Arkansas, Florida, Georgia, Illinois, Indiana, Kentucky, Maine, Maryland, Massachusetts, Michigan, Minnesota, Missouri, New Jersey, New York, North Carolina, Ohio, Oklahoma, Ontario, Pennsylvania, Quebec, South Carolina, Tennessee, Virginia, and West Virginia.

The wingspan is about 20 mm. Adults are on wing from March to November, with most records from May to August.

The larvae feed on Robinia species.
