= Microsarotis sanderyi =

Scientific classification
- Kingdom: Animalia
- Phylum: Arthropoda
- Class: Insecta
- Order: Lepidoptera
- Family: Tortricidae
- Genus: Microsarotis
- Species: M. sanderyi

Binomial name
- Microsarotis sanderyi Komai & Horak, 2006

Species of moth

Microsarotis sanderyi is a moth of the family Tortricidae. It is found in Australia, where it has been recorded from Queensland.

== Related pages ==
- List of moths of Australia
