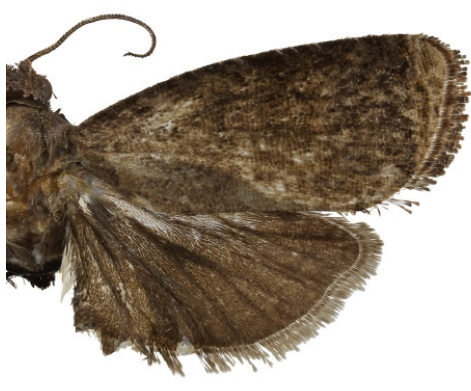
- Upperside
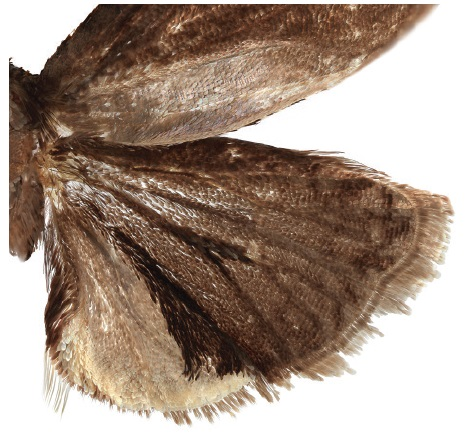
- Underside

Scientific classification
- Kingdom: Animalia
- Phylum: Arthropoda
- Class: Insecta
- Order: Lepidoptera
- Family: Tortricidae
- Genus: Thaumatovalva
- Species: T. deprinsorum

Binomial name
- Thaumatovalva deprinsorum Timm & Brown, 2014

= Thaumatovalva deprinsorum =

Species of moth

Thaumatovalva deprinsorum is a species of moth of the family Tortricidae first described by Alicia E. Timm and John Wesley Brown in 2014. It is found in the Democratic Republic of the Congo, where it has been recorded from middle elevations (1,200 to 1,810 meters).

The length of the forewings is 6.5–8.2 mm for males and about 8 mm for females. The forewings are dark brown, irregularly and faintly mixed with specks of charcoal, rust and cream. There is an inconspicuous pair of tiny cream dots ringed with orange near the distal end of the discal cell, as well as a narrow cream irregular band extending along the termen. The hindwings are nearly uniform brown. Adults have been recorded from November to December and in May.

== Etymology ==
The species is named in honour of Willy and Jurate De Prins.
