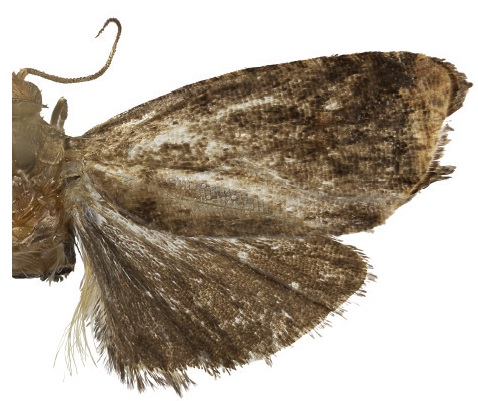
- Upperside
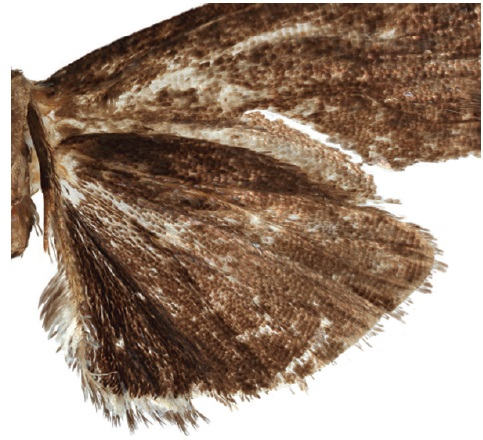
- Underside

Scientific classification
- Kingdom: Animalia
- Phylum: Arthropoda
- Class: Insecta
- Order: Lepidoptera
- Family: Tortricidae
- Genus: Thaumatovalva
- Species: T. spinai

Binomial name
- Thaumatovalva spinai (Razowski & Trematerra, 2010)

Synonyms
- Thaumatotibia spinai Razowski & Trematerra, 2010

= Thaumatovalva spinai =

Species of moth

Thaumatovalva spinai is a species of moth of the family Tortricidae first described by Józef Razowski and Pasquale Trematerra in 2010. It is found in Ethiopia and possibly Nigeria.

The length of the forewings is about 6 mm. The forewings are dark brown, irregularly and faintly mixed with specks of charcoal, rust and cream. There is an inconspicuous pair of tiny cream dots ringed with orange near the distal end of the discal cell, as well as a narrow cream irregular band extending along the termen. The hindwings are nearly uniform brown.

== Etymology ==
The species is named for Giuseppe Spina, who collected the holotype.
