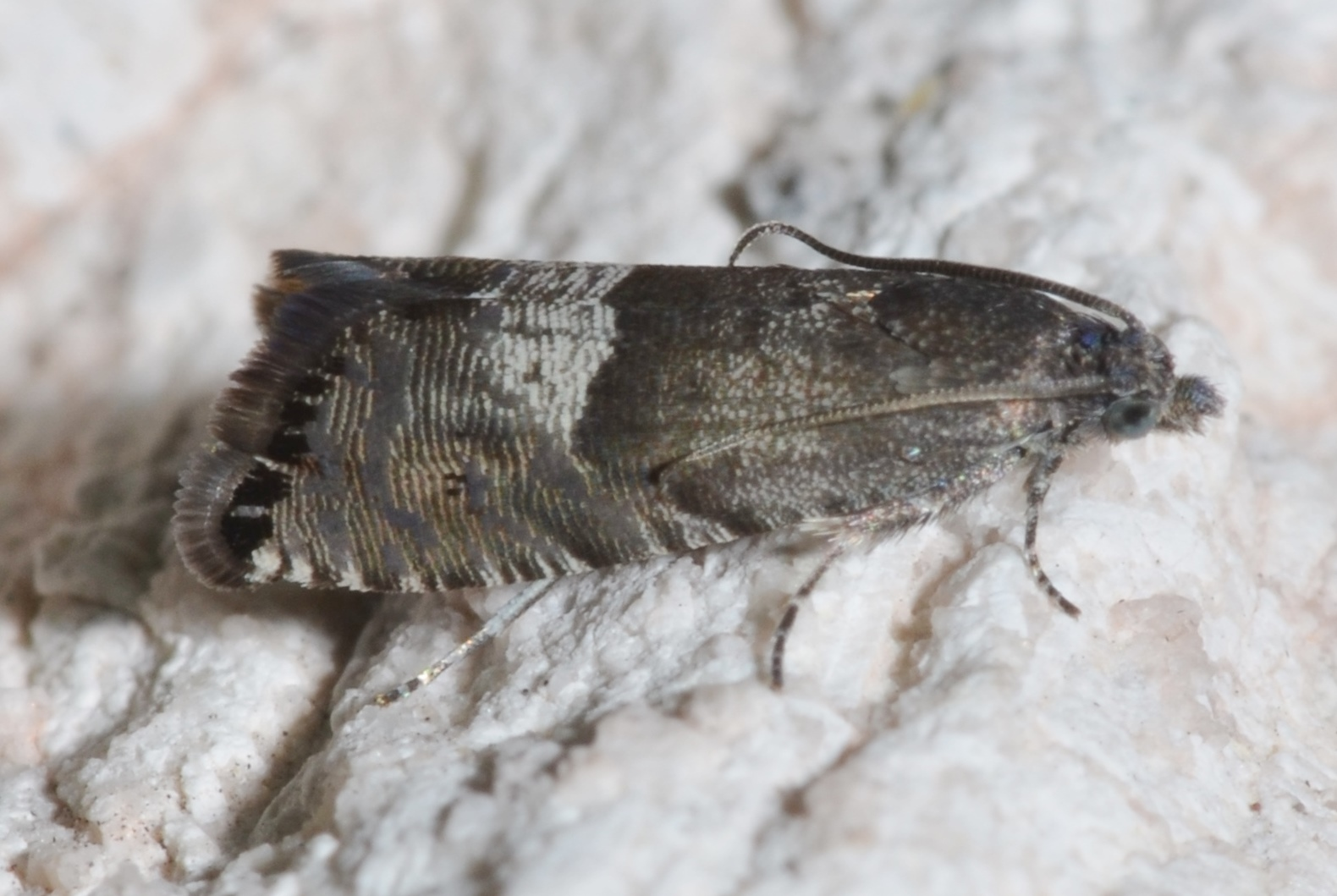
- Sereda tautana

Scientific classification
- Kingdom: Animalia
- Phylum: Arthropoda
- Class: Insecta
- Order: Lepidoptera
- Family: Tortricidae
- Tribe: Grapholitini
- Genus: Sereda; Heinrich, 1923

= Sereda =

Genus of tortrix moths

Sereda is a genus of moths belonging to the subfamily Olethreutinae of the family Tortricidae.

== Species ==
- Sereda myodes Diakonoff, 1953
- Sereda tautana (Clemens, 1865)

== See also ==
- List of Tortricidae genera
