= Acanthoclita acrocroca =

Scientific classification
- Domain: Eukaryota
- Kingdom: Animalia
- Phylum: Arthropoda
- Class: Insecta
- Order: Lepidoptera
- Family: Tortricidae
- Genus: Acanthoclita
- Species: A. acrocroca

Binomial name
- Acanthoclita acrocroca Diakonoff, 1982

Moth of the family Tortricidae from Sri Lanka

Acanthoclita acrocroca is a moth of the family Tortricidae first described by Alexey Diakonoff in 1982. It is found in Sri Lanka.

The specific epithet acrocroca is derived from Greek, meaning "yellow edged".

== Description ==
Adult A. acrocroca moths have a wingspan of 8–9 mm (0.31–0.35 in). Males have a tufted vertex and typically have thick antennae. The grey-brown antennae are finely ringed on males and simple on females. The smooth pedipalps are heavily flattened laterally in males. The median segment is fan like and dilates towards the apex. Females have a pointed terminal segment. The thorax is smooth, the metathorax is whitish, and the abdomen is greyish brown. The deeply grey-brown forewings are oblong and nearly ovate. The grey-brown costa is gradually curved with an obtuse apex. Ten to twelve stringulae are present in pairs, forming barely visible chestnut brown marks. There is a triangular spot on the base of the dorsum that is followed by an inwardly oblique wedge-shaped mark. A very faint postmedian transverse band runs to the end of the dorsum. An irregular transverse series of small quadrate dots is present on the posterior third of the wing. The apex of the wings is orange with orange to ochreous cilia. The tornus and the costa before the apex are brownish. An interrupted subapical dark band is present. The hindwings are greyish brown. The wings become dark grey brown to purplish towards the margin. The cilia are pale greyish brown with pale-grey tips. A dark subbasal band and a pale basal line are present on the hindwings.
