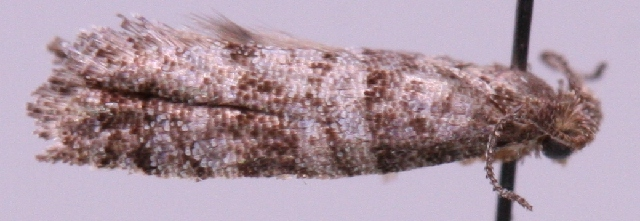

Scientific classification
- Kingdom: Animalia
- Phylum: Arthropoda
- Class: Insecta
- Order: Lepidoptera
- Family: Tortricidae
- Genus: Corticivora
- Species: C. piniana

Binomial name
- Corticivora piniana (Herrich-Schäffer, 1851)

Synonyms
- Tortrix (Coccyx) piniana Herrich-Schäffer, 1851; Tortrix piniana Herrich-Schäffer, 1848; Rhyacionia piniana

= Corticivora piniana =

Species of moth

Corticivora piniana is a moth of the family Tortricidae. It was described by Gottlieb August Wilhelm Herrich-Schäffer in 1851. It is found in large parts of Europe, except Ireland, Great Britain, the Benelux, Portugal, Denmark, Estonia, Lithuania, Poland, Ukraine and the Balkan Peninsula.

The wingspan is 8–11 mm. Adults have been recorded on wing in July.

The larvae feed on Pinus sylvestris.
