= Statignatha =

Scientific classification
- Kingdom: Animalia
- Phylum: Arthropoda
- Class: Insecta
- Order: Lepidoptera
- Family: Tortricidae
- Tribe: Grapholitini
- Genus: Statignatha; Kuznetzov, 1992

Genus of tortrix moths

Statignatha is a genus of moths belonging to the family Tortricidae.

== Species ==
- Statignatha novitana Kuznetzov, 1992
- Statignatha primigena (Meyrick, 1912)

== See also ==
- List of Tortricidae genera
