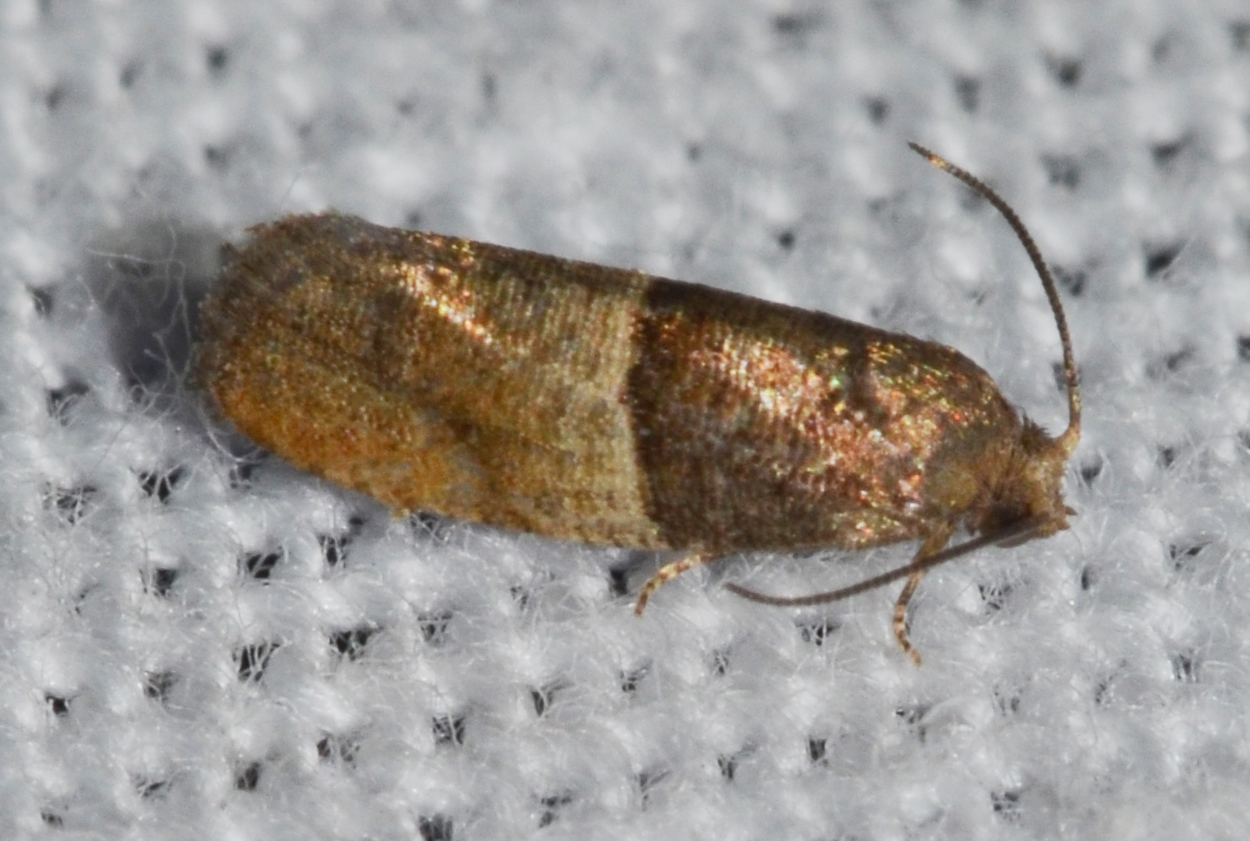

Scientific classification
- Kingdom: Animalia
- Phylum: Arthropoda
- Clade: Pancrustacea
- Class: Insecta
- Order: Lepidoptera
- Family: Tortricidae
- Subfamily: Olethreutinae
- Tribe: Grapholitini
- Genus: Larisa; Miller, 1978
- Species: L. subsolana

Binomial name
- Larisa subsolana Miller, 1978

= Larisa subsolana =

Species of moth

Larisa is a genus of moths belonging to the subfamily Olethreutinae of the family Tortricidae. It contains only one species, Larisa subsolana, which is found in North America, where it has been recorded from Alabama, Florida, Georgia, Illinois, Indiana, Kentucky, Maine, Maryland, Massachusetts, Minnesota, Mississippi, Missouri, New York, Ohio, Oklahoma, Ontario, Quebec, South Carolina, Tennessee, Texas, Virginia, and West Virginia.

The larvae feed on Carya illinoinensis.

== See also ==
- List of Tortricidae genera
