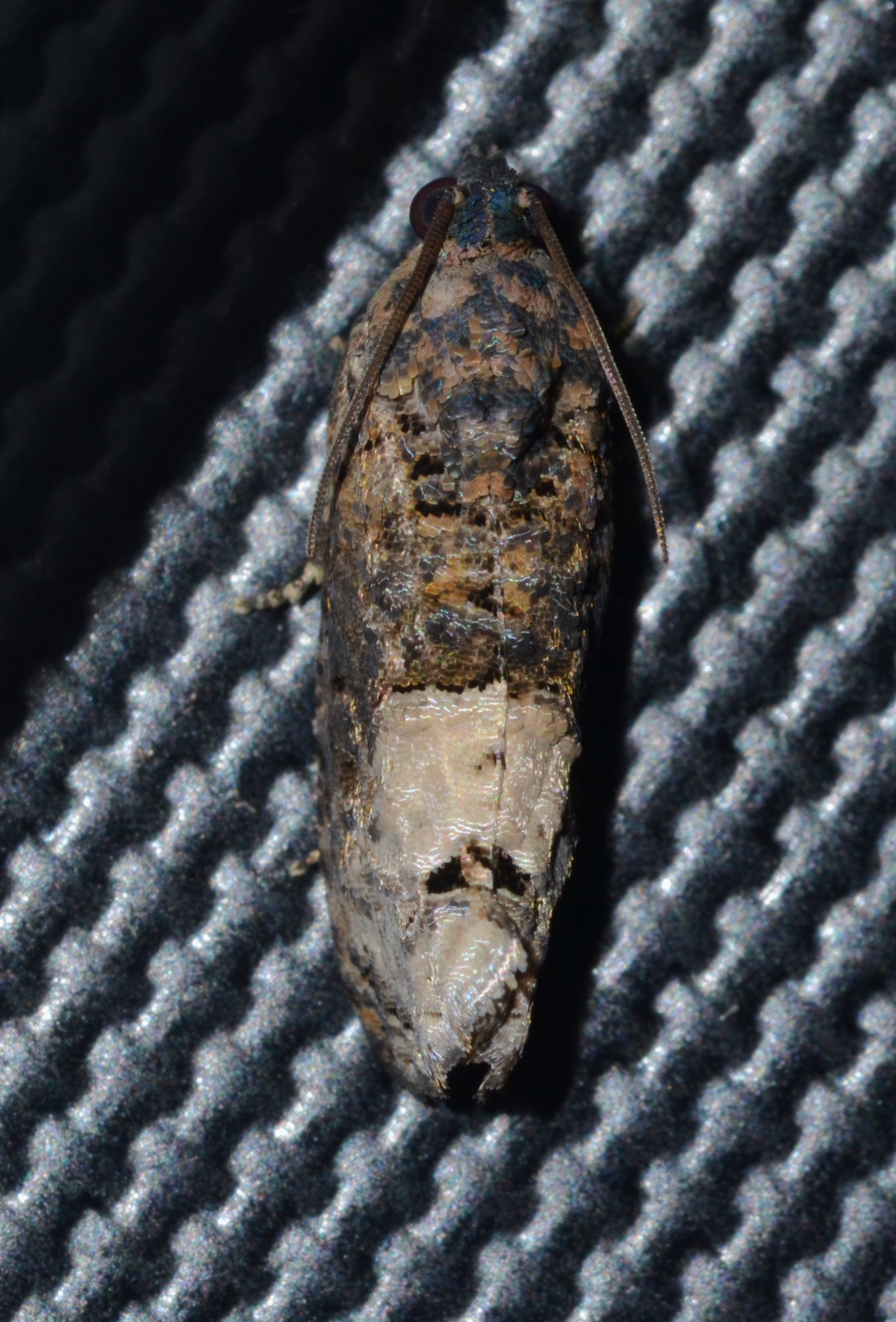

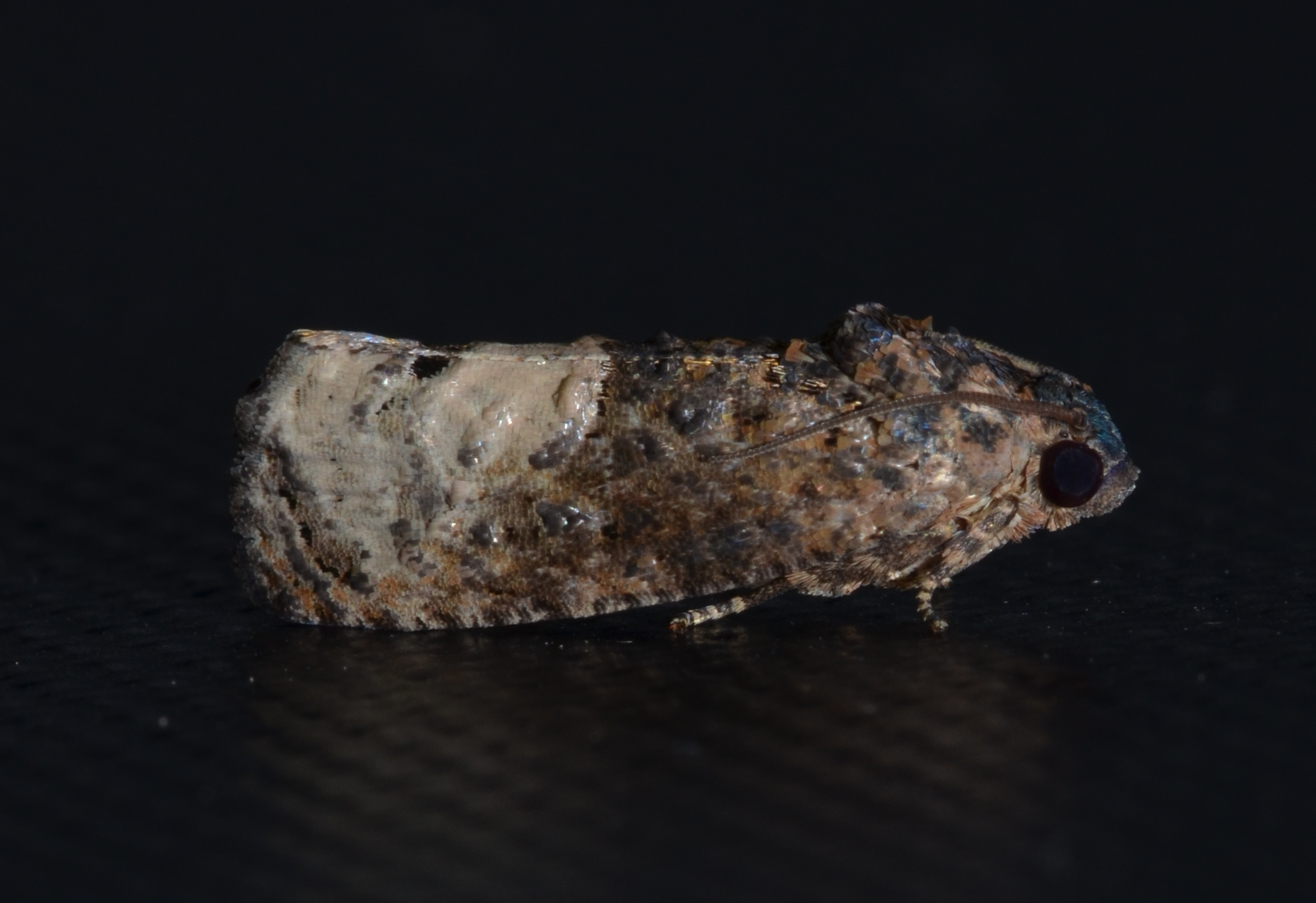

Scientific classification
- Kingdom: Animalia
- Phylum: Arthropoda
- Clade: Pancrustacea
- Class: Insecta
- Order: Lepidoptera
- Family: Tortricidae
- Genus: Ecdytolopha
- Species: E. insiticiana

Binomial name
- Ecdytolopha insiticiana Zeller, 1875

= Ecdytolopha insiticiana =

Species of moth

Ecdytolopha insiticiana, the locust twig borer is a moth of the family Tortricidae. It is found in North America, including Pennsylvania, Iowa, West Virginia, Arkansas, Massachusetts, New York and Ontario.

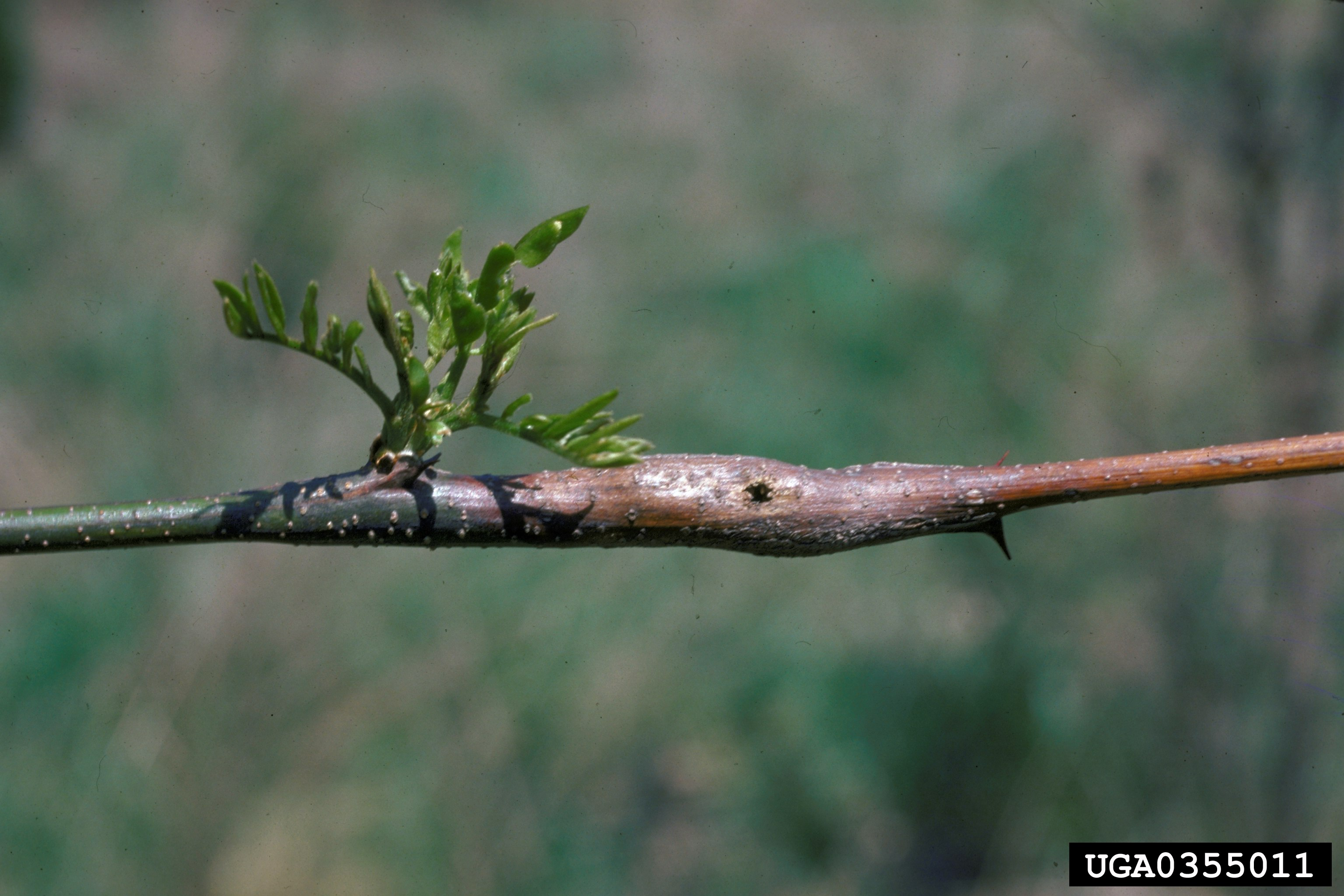
Damage

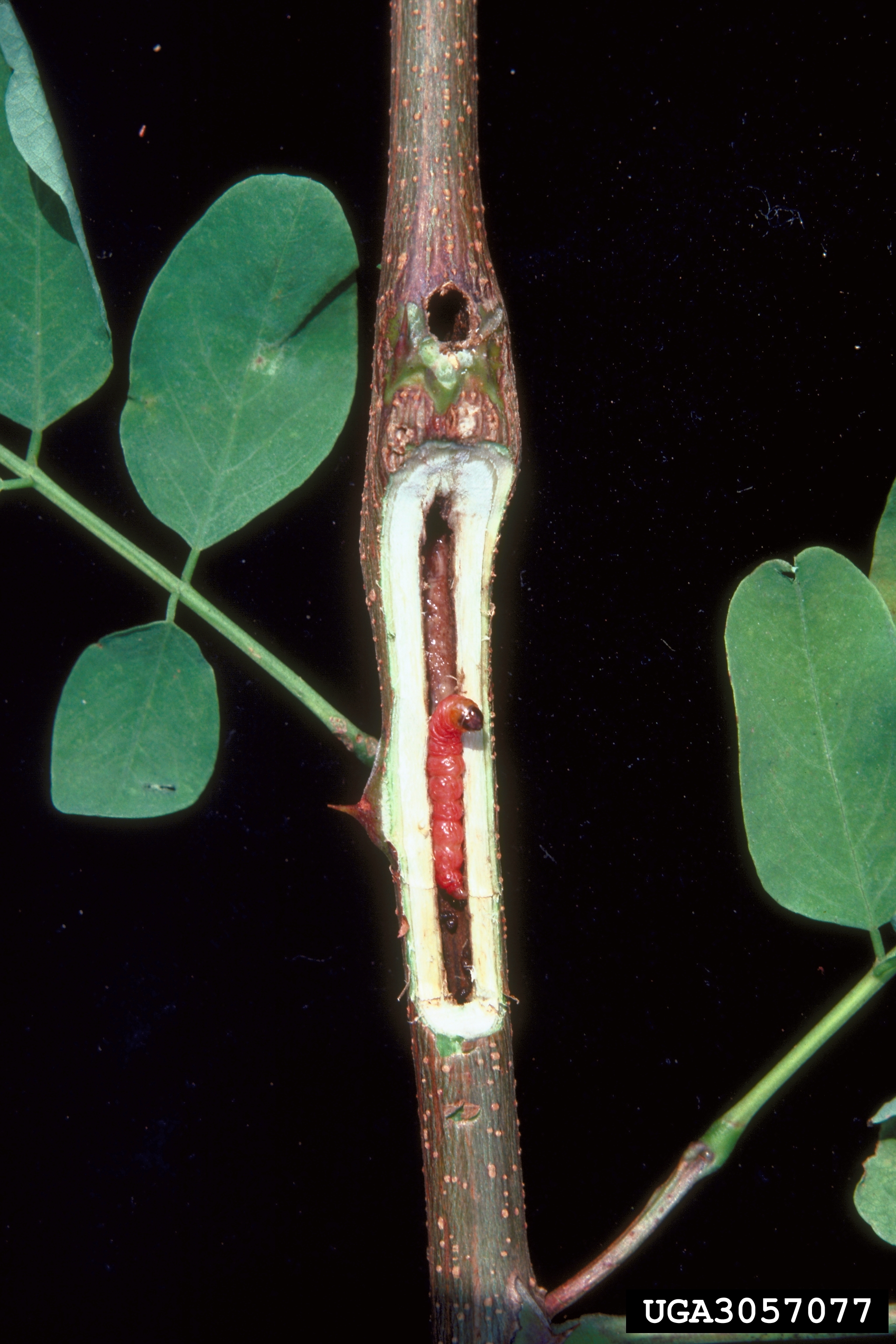
Larva

The wingspan is 20–25 mm. Adults are on wing from May to August.

The larvae feed on Robinia pseudoacacia. The larvae feed within the stem pith of seedlings, stump sprouts and new stem growth of older trees.
