= Matsumuraeses falcana =

Scientific classification
- Kingdom: Animalia
- Phylum: Arthropoda
- Class: Insecta
- Order: Lepidoptera
- Family: Tortricidae
- Genus: Matsumuraeses
- Species: M. falcana

Binomial name
- Matsumuraeses falcana (Walsingham, 1900)

Synonyms
- Eucelis falcana Walsingham, 1900; Eucosma metacritica Meyrick, 1922

Species of moth

Matsumuraeses falcana is a moth of the family Tortricidae. It is found in Nepal, China, Taiwan, Japan and Vietnam.
