= Parapammene =

Scientific classification
- Kingdom: Animalia
- Phylum: Arthropoda
- Class: Insecta
- Order: Lepidoptera
- Family: Tortricidae
- Tribe: Grapholitini
- Genus: Parapammene; Obraztsov, 1960

Genus of tortrix moths

Parapammene is a genus of moths belonging to the subfamily Olethreutinae of the family Tortricidae.

== Species ==
- Parapammene amphibola (Diakonoff, 1982)
- Parapammene aurifascia Kuznetzov, 1981
- Parapammene cyanodesma Diakonoff, 1976
- Parapammene dichroramphana (Kennel, 1900)
- Parapammene dyserasta (Turner, 1916)
- Parapammene ellipticopa (Meyrick, 1934)
- Parapammene glaucana (Kennel, 1901)
- Parapammene harmologa (Obraztsov, 1968)
- Parapammene hexaphora (Meyrick, in Caradja & Meyrick, 1935)
- Parapammene imitatrix Kuznetzov, in Ler, 1986
- Parapammene inobservata Kuznetzov, 1962
- Parapammene isocampta (Meyrick, 1914)
- Parapammene longipalpana Kuznetzov, 1992
- Parapammene petulantana (Kennel, 1901)
- Parapammene reversa Komai, 1999
- Parapammene selectana (Christoph, 1882)

== See also ==
- List of Tortricidae genera
