= Microsarotis lucida =

Scientific classification
- Domain: Eukaryota
- Kingdom: Animalia
- Phylum: Arthropoda
- Class: Insecta
- Order: Lepidoptera
- Family: Tortricidae
- Genus: Microsarotis
- Species: M. lucida

Binomial name
- Microsarotis lucida (Meyrick, 1916)

Synonyms
- Laspeyresia lucida Meyrick, 1916

Species of moth

Microsarotis lucida is a moth of the family Tortricidae first described by Edward Meyrick in 1916. It is found in India and Sri Lanka.
