= Microsarotis =

Scientific classification
- Kingdom: Animalia
- Phylum: Arthropoda
- Class: Insecta
- Order: Lepidoptera
- Family: Tortricidae
- Tribe: Grapholitini
- Genus: Microsarotis; Diakonoff, 1982

Genus of tortrix moths

Microsarotis is a genus of moths belonging to the subfamily Olethreutinae of the family Tortricidae.

== Species ==
- Microsarotis arushae Razowski, 2015
- Microsarotis bicincta (Diakonoff, 1976)
- Microsarotis lucida (Meyrick, 1916)
- Microsarotis lygistis (Diakonoff, 1977)
- Microsarotis palamedes (Meyrick, 1916)
- Microsarotis pauliani Diakonoff, 1988
- Microsarotis samaruana Razowski, 2013
- Microsarotis sanderyi Komai & Horak, in Horak, 2006

== See also ==
- List of Tortricidae genera
