= Acanthoclita balia =

Scientific classification
- Domain: Eukaryota
- Kingdom: Animalia
- Phylum: Arthropoda
- Class: Insecta
- Order: Lepidoptera
- Family: Tortricidae
- Genus: Acanthoclita
- Species: A. balia

Binomial name
- Acanthoclita balia Diakonoff, 1982

Species of moth

Acanthoclita balia is a moth of the family Tortricidae first described by Alexey Diakonoff in 1982. It is found in Sri Lanka.

The specific name balia is derived from Greek and means "spotted". This refers to the spotted thorax and wings of the moth.

== Description ==
Females have a wingspan of 11.5 mm (0.45 in). Both the head and antennae are dark brownish grey. The dark brownish-grey pedipalps are small and slightly curved. The thorax is grey to ochre with irregular dark black spots. The abdomen is light gold to grey brown. The forewings are oblong in shape, with a rounded to rectangular apex. The forewings are whitish grey and are partly tinged with ochre, and are densely marbled with dark grey brown and black. The costa has a distinct whitish oblong to nearly rectangular spot from the basal area to the middle of the forewing. The spot is followed by an oblique black band that runs to the middle of the costa. The posterior area of the costa has five wide pairs of pale oblique lines. A large irregular leaden-grey circular spot is present on the upper angle of the cell. A whitish wedge-shaped patch can be found on the posterior corner of the forewing. There is a whitish sub-horizontal streak that runs halfway between middle of the fold and the dorsum. The remaining area of the forewings is dark brownish grey mixed with irregular black spots. The cilia are dark or pale brownish grey, with both a pale basal line and dark basal band. The hindwings are bronze to grey brown.
