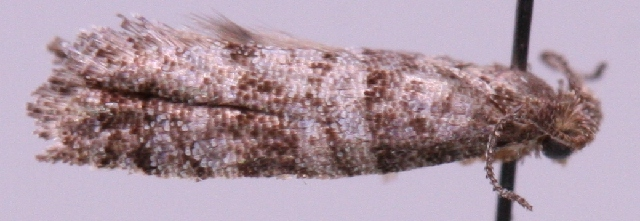
- Corticivora piniana

Scientific classification
- Kingdom: Animalia
- Phylum: Arthropoda
- Class: Insecta
- Order: Lepidoptera
- Family: Tortricidae
- Tribe: Grapholitini
- Genus: Corticivora; Clarke, 1951

= Corticivora =

Genus of tortrix moths

Corticivora is a genus of moths belonging to the subfamily Olethreutinae of the family Tortricidae.

== Species ==
- Corticivora chica Brown, 1984
- Corticivora clarki Clarke, 1951
- Corticivora parva Brown, 1984
- Corticivora piniana (Herrich-Schäffer, 1851)

== See also ==
- List of Tortricidae genera
