= Pseudogalleria inimicella =

Scientific classification
- Kingdom: Animalia
- Phylum: Arthropoda
- Clade: Pancrustacea
- Class: Insecta
- Order: Lepidoptera
- Family: Tortricidae
- Genus: Pseudogalleria
- Species: P. inimicella

Binomial name
- Pseudogalleria inimicella (Zeller, 1872)

Synonyms
- Galleria inimicella Zeller, 1872; Taurometopa inimicella

Species of moth

Pseudogalleria inimicella, the inimical borer moth, is a moth in the family Tortricidae. It was described by Zeller in 1872. It is found in North America, where it has been recorded from Alabama, Arkansas, Florida, Georgia, Illinois, Indiana, Kentucky, Maine, Maryland, New Hampshire, North Carolina, Ohio, Oklahoma, Ontario, South Carolina, Tennessee, Texas and West Virginia.

The wingspan is 16.5–23 mm. Adults have been recorded on wing from January to October.
