= Spanistoneura acrospodia =

Scientific classification
- Kingdom: Animalia
- Phylum: Arthropoda
- Class: Insecta
- Order: Lepidoptera
- Family: Tortricidae
- Genus: Spanistoneura
- Species: S. acrospodia

Binomial name
- Spanistoneura acrospodia Diakonoff, 1982

Species of moth

Spanistoneura acrospodia is a moth of the family Tortricidae first described by Alexey Diakonoff in 1982. It is found in Sri Lanka.

The specific name acrospodia is derived from Greek, meaning "cinereous edge", referring to the pale grey cilia of the wing.

== Description ==
Adult moths have a wingspan of 5–8 mm (0.20–0.31 in). Female moths are larger than males, with enlarged eyes. The head, antennae and thorax are brownish grey with a strong white to ash-grey opalescence, with the thorax becoming green to blue under certain light. The antenna is thickened in both sexes. The pedipalps are pale grey. The abdomen is darker brownish grey and lacks opalescence, and the ventral side is whitish. The posterior leg pair is silvery white. The brownish-grey forewings are broad, oblong, and truncate in shape with the costa curved at its base. The apex of the forewing is pointed. The termen is almost straight, but slightly curved. The basal half of the forewing has a strong light-grey opalescence. The costa has nine or ten pairs of minute, indistinct oblique white lines. There is a purple to black oblique pattern of lines found in the middle of the costal area. An oblong purple to black spot is present on the forewing. The pale grey cilia are a brownish ash grey. Males have purple to bronze hindwings and females have dark brown hindwings. In both sexes, the third and fourth veins are coincident, and the sixth and seventh veins are separate in male moths and stalked in females.
