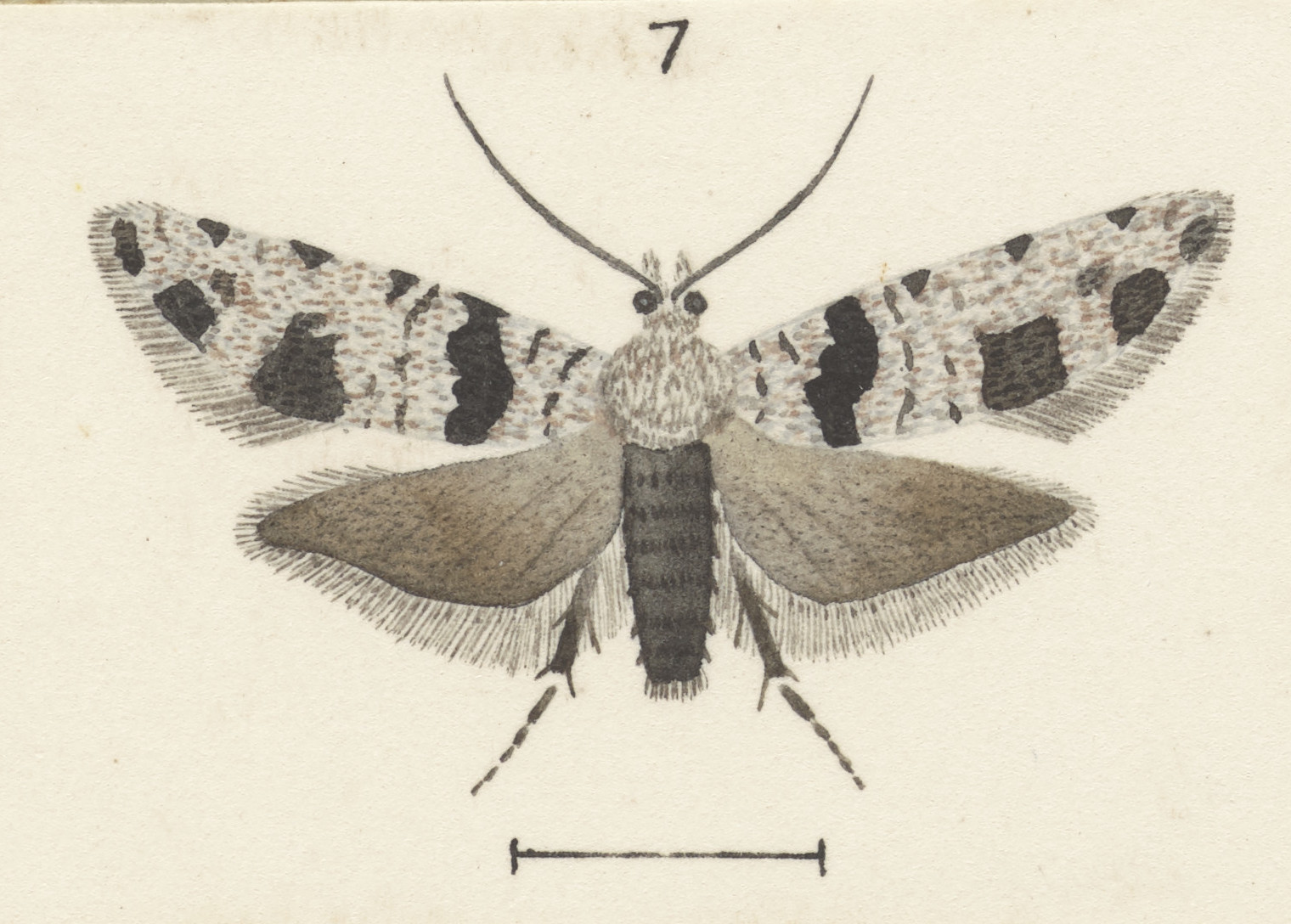
- Illustration of female P. mochlophorana
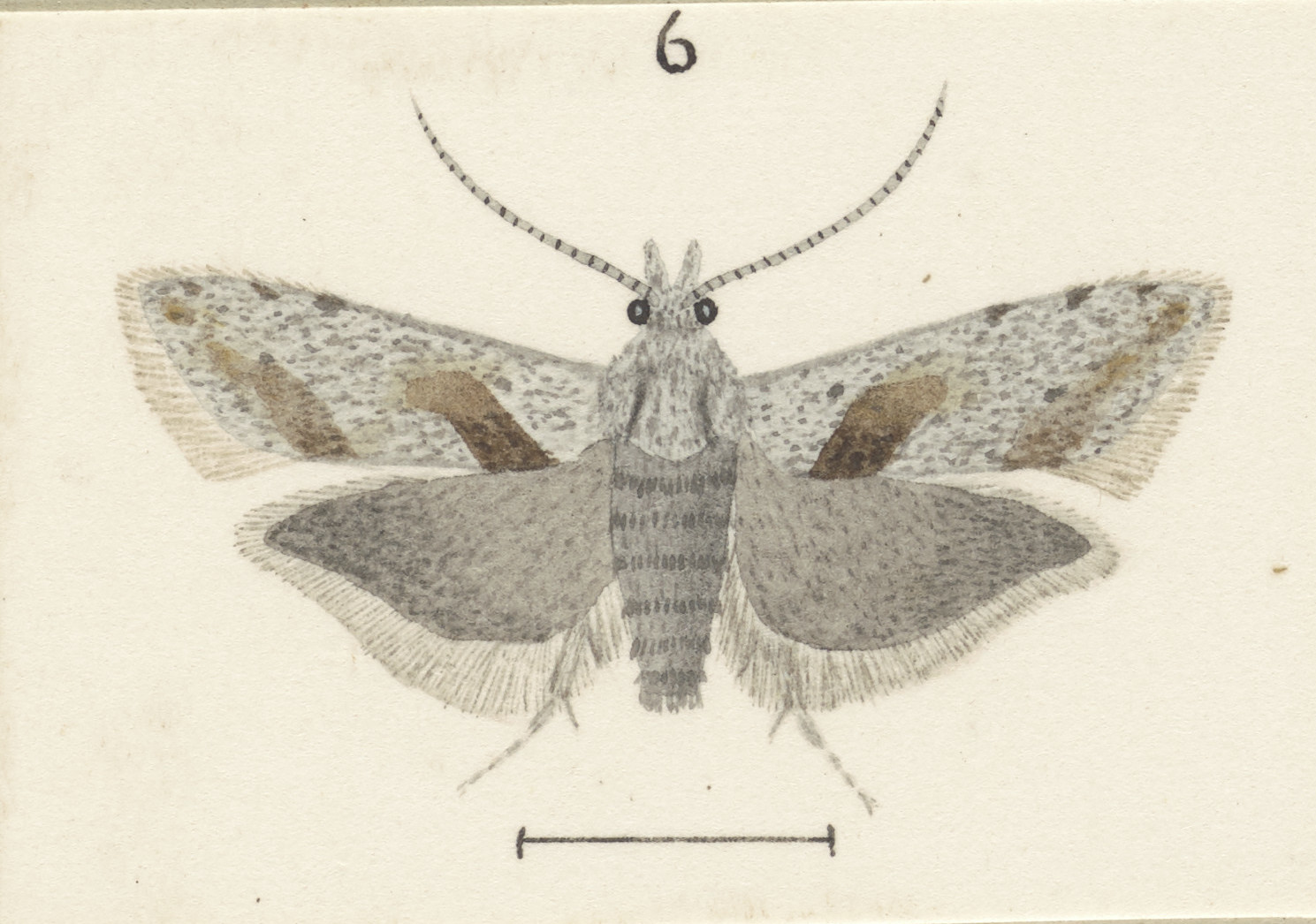
- Illustration of male P. mochlophorana

Conservation status
- Nationally Critical (NZ TCS)

Scientific classification
- Kingdom: Animalia
- Phylum: Arthropoda
- Clade: Pancrustacea
- Class: Insecta
- Order: Lepidoptera
- Family: Tortricidae
- Subfamily: Olethreutinae
- Tribe: Grapholitini
- Genus: Parienia; Berg, 1899
- Species: P. mochlophorana

Binomial name
- Parienia mochlophorana (Meyrick, 1882)

Synonyms
- Excoria mochlophorana Meyrick, 1882; Epiblemma aphrias (Meyrick, 1901); Epiblema aphrias Meyrick, 1901; Parienia aphrias (Meyrick, 1901); Eurythecta trimaculata Philpott, 1915; Parienia trimaculata (Philpott, 1915)

= Parienia =

Genus of tortrix moths

Parienia is a genus of moths belonging to the subfamily Olethreutinae of the family Tortricidae. This genus was described by Edward Meyrick in 1881. It consists of only one species, Parienia mochlophorana, which is endemic to New Zealand. In 2025 this species was classified as "nationally critical" under the New Zealand Threat Classification System by the Department of Conservation as it is impacted by climate change, is in need of conservation research as it is data poor and is range restricted.

== Habitat and host species ==
The larvae of this moth is semi-aquatic and can be found in and around seepages or on surface detritus near moist areas. The larva pupates in turf. The larval hosts of this species of moth are likely to be plants or debris found in this moist habitat.

== Conservation status ==
In 2025 this species was classified as "Nationally Critical" with the report stating that this species is impacted by climate change, is in need of conservation research as the species has a lack of data on both the population size as well as how the population is changing over time, and is range restricted.
