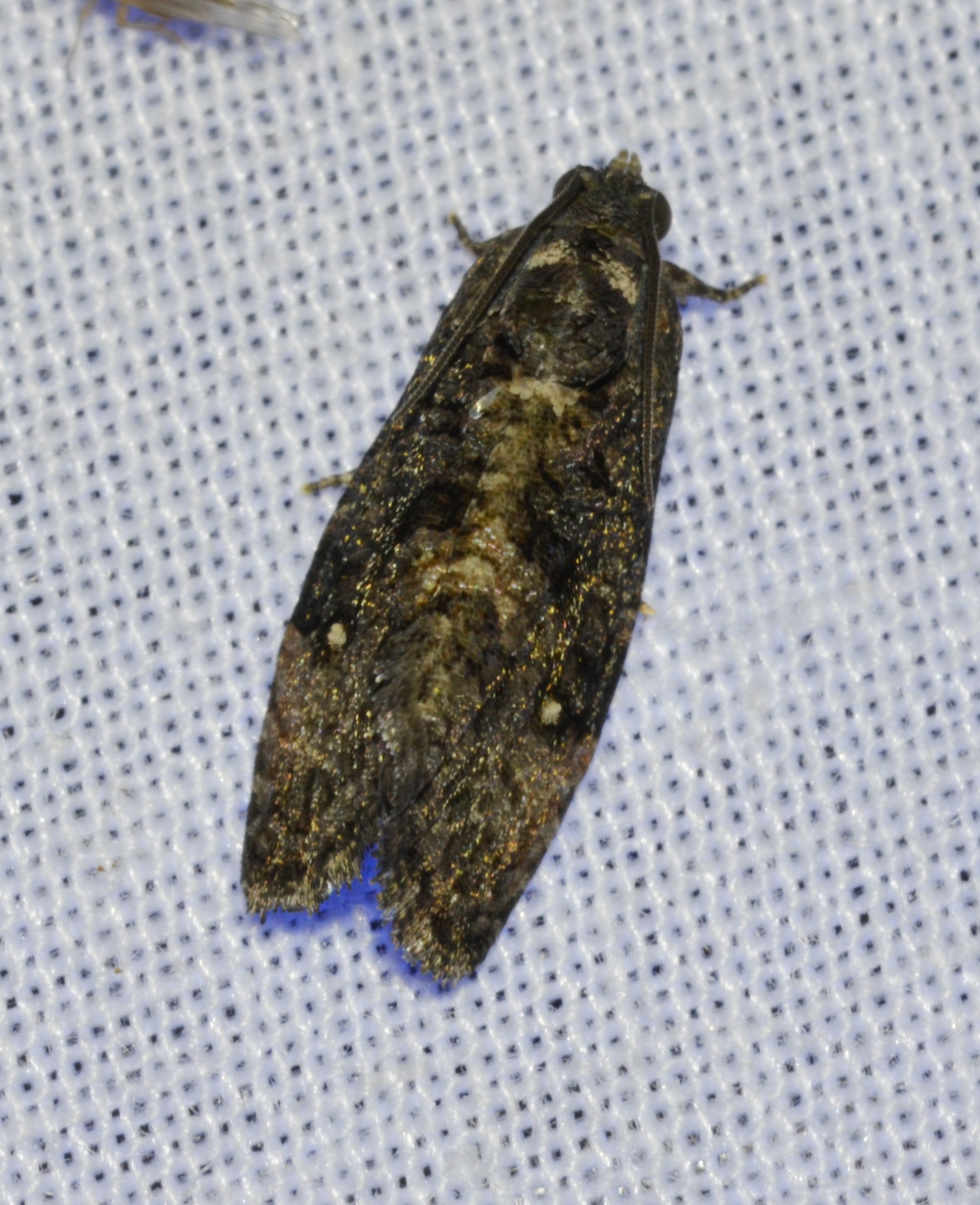
- Gymnandrosoma punctidiscanum

Scientific classification
- Kingdom: Animalia
- Phylum: Arthropoda
- Class: Insecta
- Order: Lepidoptera
- Family: Tortricidae
- Tribe: Grapholitini
- Genus: Gymnandrosoma; Dyar, 1904

Synonyms
- Gynandrosoma Sharp, 1905

= Gymnandrosoma =

Genus of tortrix moths

Gymnandrosoma is a genus of moths belonging to the family Tortricidae.

== Species ==
- Gymnandrosoma aurantianum Lima, 1927
- Gymnandrosoma cryptotortanum Adamski & Brown, 2001
- Gymnandrosoma desotanum Heinrich, 1926
- Gymnandrosoma gonomela (Lower, 1899)
- Gymnandrosoma leucothorax Adamski & Brown, 2001
- Gymnandrosoma linaresensis Adamski & Brown, 2001
- Gymnandrosoma punctidiscanum Dyar, 1904
- Gymnandrosoma trachycerus Forbes, 1931

== See also ==
- List of Tortricidae genera
