= Eucosmocydia =

Scientific classification
- Kingdom: Animalia
- Phylum: Arthropoda
- Class: Insecta
- Order: Lepidoptera
- Family: Tortricidae
- Tribe: Grapholitini
- Genus: Eucosmocydia; Diakonoff, 1988

Genus of tortrix moths

Eucosmocydia is a genus of moths belonging to the family Tortricidae.

== Species ==
- Eucosmocydia mixographa (Meyrick, 1939)
- Eucosmocydia oedipus Diakonoff, 1988

== See also ==
- List of Tortricidae genera
