= Eucosmocydia mixographa =

Scientific classification
- Kingdom: Animalia
- Phylum: Arthropoda
- Clade: Pancrustacea
- Class: Insecta
- Order: Lepidoptera
- Family: Tortricidae
- Genus: Eucosmocydia
- Species: E. mixographa

Binomial name
- Eucosmocydia mixographa (Meyrick, 1939)

Synonyms
- Laspeyresia mixographa Meyrick, 1939

Species of moth

Eucosmocydia mixographa is a species of moth of the family Tortricidae. It is found in the Democratic Republic of Congo.

The larvae feed on Piptadenia africana and Mallotus oppositifolius.
