= Microsarotis palamedes =

Scientific classification
- Kingdom: Animalia
- Phylum: Arthropoda
- Class: Insecta
- Order: Lepidoptera
- Family: Tortricidae
- Genus: Microsarotis
- Species: M. palamedes

Binomial name
- Microsarotis palamedes (Meyrick, 1916)

Synonyms
- Laspeyresia palamedes Meyrick, 1916

Species of moth

Microsarotis palamedes is a moth of the family Tortricidae first described by Edward Meyrick in 1916. It is found in India, Vietnam, Sri Lanka and possibly Java.

The larvae feed on Tamarindus indica, Bauhinia purpurea and Lantana species.
