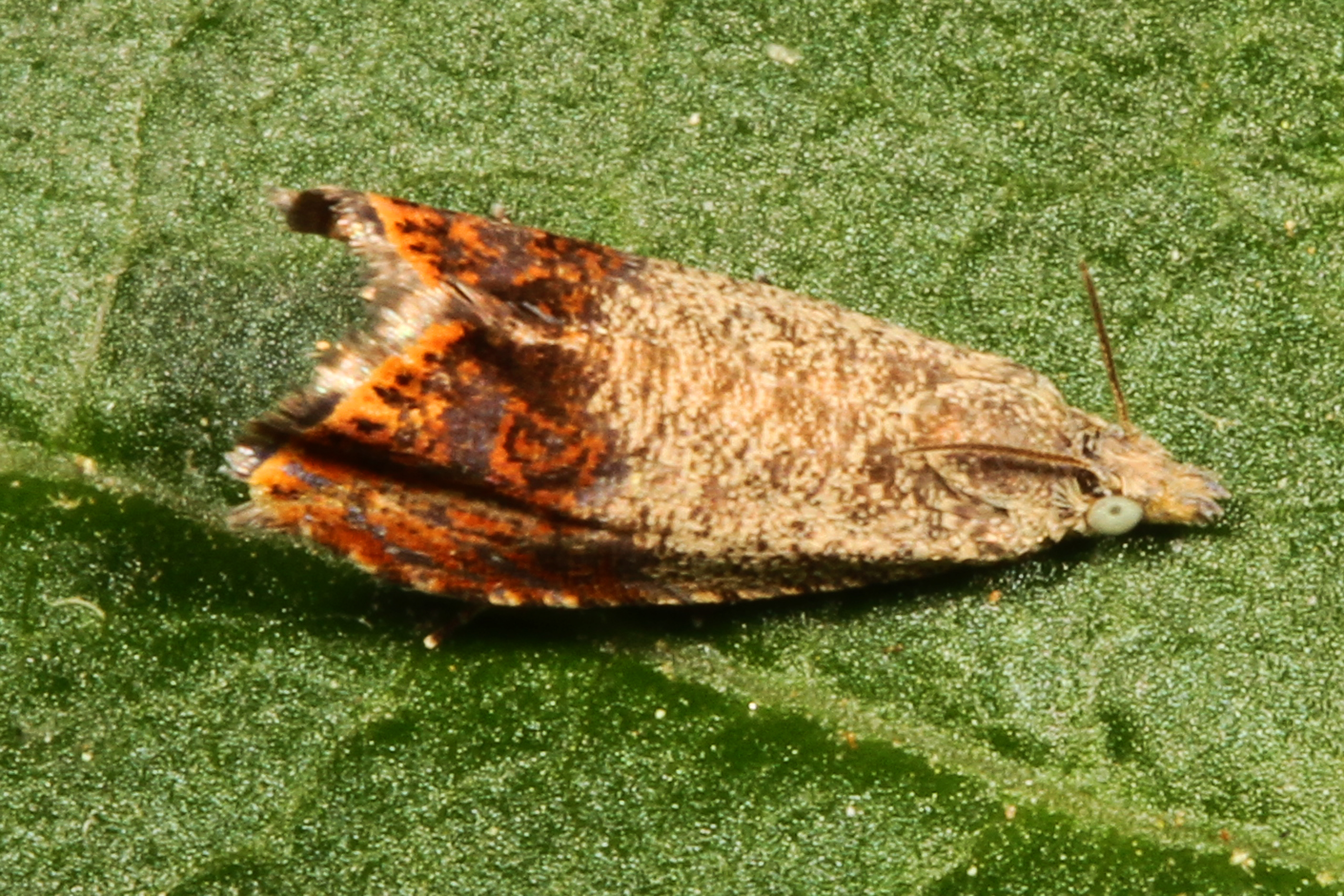

Scientific classification
- Kingdom: Animalia
- Phylum: Arthropoda
- Clade: Pancrustacea
- Class: Insecta
- Order: Lepidoptera
- Family: Tortricidae
- Genus: Talponia
- Species: T. plummeriana

Binomial name
- Talponia plummeriana (Busck, 1906)

Synonyms
- Hemimene plummeriana Busck, 1906

= Talponia plummeriana =

Pawpaw peduncle borer

Talponia plummeriana, the speckled talponia moth or pawpaw peduncle borer, is a moth of the family Tortricidae. It is native to the southeastern United States.

The wingspan is about 9–10 millimetres (23/64–25/64 in). Adults are powdery gray along thorax and basal half of fore wing; hind wing and outer half of fore wing is purplish brown.

The larvae feed on Asimina species, particularly Asimina triloba, the common pawpaw. T. plummeriana is one of the few species capable of surviving the elevated level of annonacin found in pawpaws. Feeding takes place when larvae bore into the peduncle of the pawpaw flower, causing the flower to drop and thereby decreasing fruit yield. While more typically documented in the peduncle of the flower, larvae have been observed burrowing into the fruit of the pawpaw. The larvae are occasionally consumed by insectivorous birds such as the golden-winged warbler.

T. plummeriana may be found throughout the native range of the pawpaw. It was first described from a specimen collected at Plummers Island, Maryland and was named for its type locality.
