= Pseudogalleria =

Scientific classification
- Kingdom: Animalia
- Phylum: Arthropoda
- Class: Insecta
- Order: Lepidoptera
- Family: Tortricidae
- Tribe: Grapholitini
- Genus: Pseudogalleria; Ragonot, 1884

Genus of tortrix moths

Pseudogalleria is a genus of moths belonging to the subfamily Olethreutinae of the family Tortricidae.

== Species ==
- Pseudogalleria inimicella (Zeller, 1872)

== See also ==
- List of Tortricidae genera
