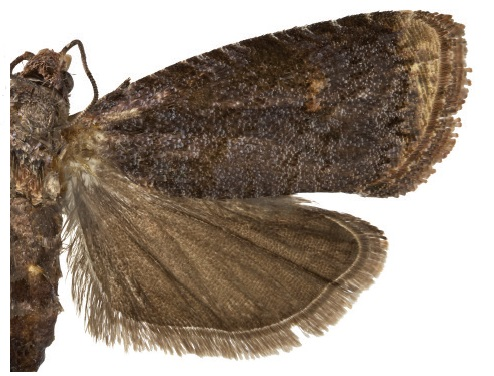
- Upperside
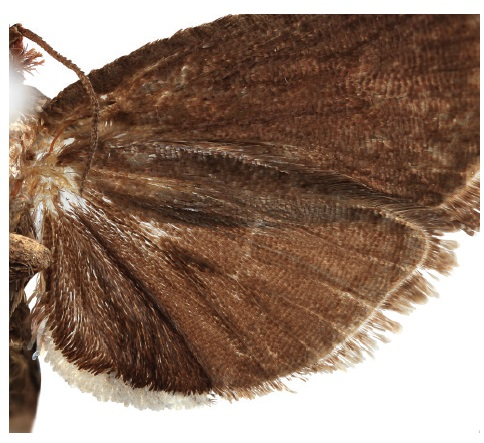
- Underside

Scientific classification
- Kingdom: Animalia
- Phylum: Arthropoda
- Class: Insecta
- Order: Lepidoptera
- Family: Tortricidae
- Genus: Thaumatovalva
- Species: T. albolineana

Binomial name
- Thaumatovalva albolineana Timm & Brown, 2014

= Thaumatovalva albolineana =

Species of moth

Thaumatovalva albolineana is a species of moth of the family Tortricidae first described by Alicia E. Timm and John Wesley Brown in 2014. It is found in the Democratic Republic of the Congo and Kenya. It is found at altitudes between about 1,500 and 1,600 meters.

The length of the forewings is 5.8–7.5 mm for males and 6–8 mm for females. The forewings are dark brown, irregularly and faintly mixed with specks of charcoal, rust and cream. There is an inconspicuous pair of tiny cream dots ringed with orange near the distal end of the discal cell, as well as a narrow cream irregular band extending along the termen. The hindwings are nearly uniform brown. Adults have been recorded from February to June in the Democratic Republic of the Congo and in November in Kenya.

== Etymology ==
The species name refers to the narrow band of white scales on the underside of the hindwings.
