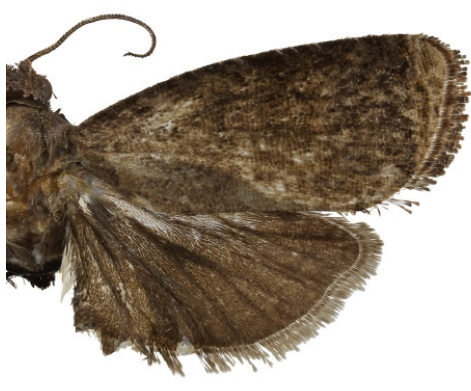
- Thaumatovalva deprinsorum

Scientific classification
- Kingdom: Animalia
- Phylum: Arthropoda
- Class: Insecta
- Order: Lepidoptera
- Family: Tortricidae
- Tribe: Grapholitini
- Genus: Thaumatovalva; Timm & Brown, 2014

= Thaumatovalva =

Genus of moths

Thaumatovalva is a genus of moths belonging to the family Tortricidae. The genus was erected by Alicia E. Timm and John Wesley Brown in 2014.

== Species ==
- Thaumatovalva albolineana Timm & Brown, 2014
- Thaumatovalva deprinsorum Timm & Brown, 2014
- Thaumatovalva limbata (Diakonoff, 1969)
- Thaumatovalva spinai (Razowski & Trematerra, 2010)

== Etymology ==
The genus name is derived from Latin thaumato (meaning miracle, wonder) and the morphological term valva.

== See also ==
- List of Tortricidae genera
