= Ethelgoda =

Scientific classification
- Kingdom: Animalia
- Phylum: Arthropoda
- Class: Insecta
- Order: Lepidoptera
- Family: Tortricidae
- Subfamily: Olethreutinae
- Genus: Ethelgoda; Heinrich, 1926

Genus of tortrix moths

Ethelgoda is a genus of moths belonging to the family Tortricidae.

== Species ==
- Ethelgoda texanana (Walsingham, 1879)

== See also ==
- List of Tortricidae genera
