= Commoneria =

Scientific classification
- Kingdom: Animalia
- Phylum: Arthropoda
- Class: Insecta
- Order: Lepidoptera
- Family: Tortricidae
- Subfamily: Olethreutinae
- Genus: Commoneria; Horak & Komai, 2006

Genus of tortrix moths

Commoneria is a genus of moths of the family Tortricidae.

== Species ==
- Commoneria costaplica (Pinkaew, Muadsub & Jaikla, 2022)
- Commoneria cyanosticha (Turner, 1946)
- Commoneria sinuata (Pinkaew, Muadsub & Jaikla, 2022)

== See also ==
- List of Tortricidae genera
