= Leguminivora =

Scientific classification
- Kingdom: Animalia
- Phylum: Arthropoda
- Clade: Pancrustacea
- Class: Insecta
- Order: Lepidoptera
- Family: Tortricidae
- Subfamily: Olethreutinae
- Genus: Leguminivora; Obraztsov, 1960

Type species
- Leguminivora glycinivorella (Matsumura, 1898)

Genus of tortrix moths

Leguminivora is a genus of moths belonging to the subfamily Olethreutinae of the family Tortricidae.

== Species ==
- Legumivora anthracotis (Meyrick, 1913)
- Leguminivora glycinivorella (Matsumura, 1898) (China, India, Japan, Africa)
- Legumivora ischnodes Razowski & Wojtusiak, 2012
- Leguminivora longigula Komai & Horak, in Horak, 2006 (Australia)
- Leguminivora meridiana Kuznetzov, 1992
- Legumivora parastrepta (Meyrick, 1907)
- Leguminivora ptychora (Meyrick, 1907)

== See also ==
- List of Tortricidae genera
