= Dierlia =

Scientific classification
- Kingdom: Animalia
- Phylum: Arthropoda
- Class: Insecta
- Order: Lepidoptera
- Family: Tortricidae
- Subfamily: Olethreutinae
- Genus: Dierlia; Diakonoff, 1976

Genus of tortrix moths

Dierlia is a genus of moths belonging to the subfamily Olethreutinae of the family Tortricidae.

== Species ==
- Dierlia aurata Diakonoff, 1976
- Dierlia poeciloptera Diakonoff, 1976

== See also ==
- List of Tortricidae genera
