= Archiphlebia =

Scientific classification
- Kingdom: Animalia
- Phylum: Arthropoda
- Class: Insecta
- Order: Lepidoptera
- Family: Tortricidae
- Subfamily: Olethreutinae
- Genus: Archiphlebia; Horak & Komai, 2006

Genus of tortrix moths

Archiphlebia is a genus of moths of the family Tortricidae.

== Species ==
- Archiphlebia endophaga (Meyrick, 1911)
- Archiphlebia rutilescens (Turner, 1945)

== See also ==
- List of Tortricidae genera
