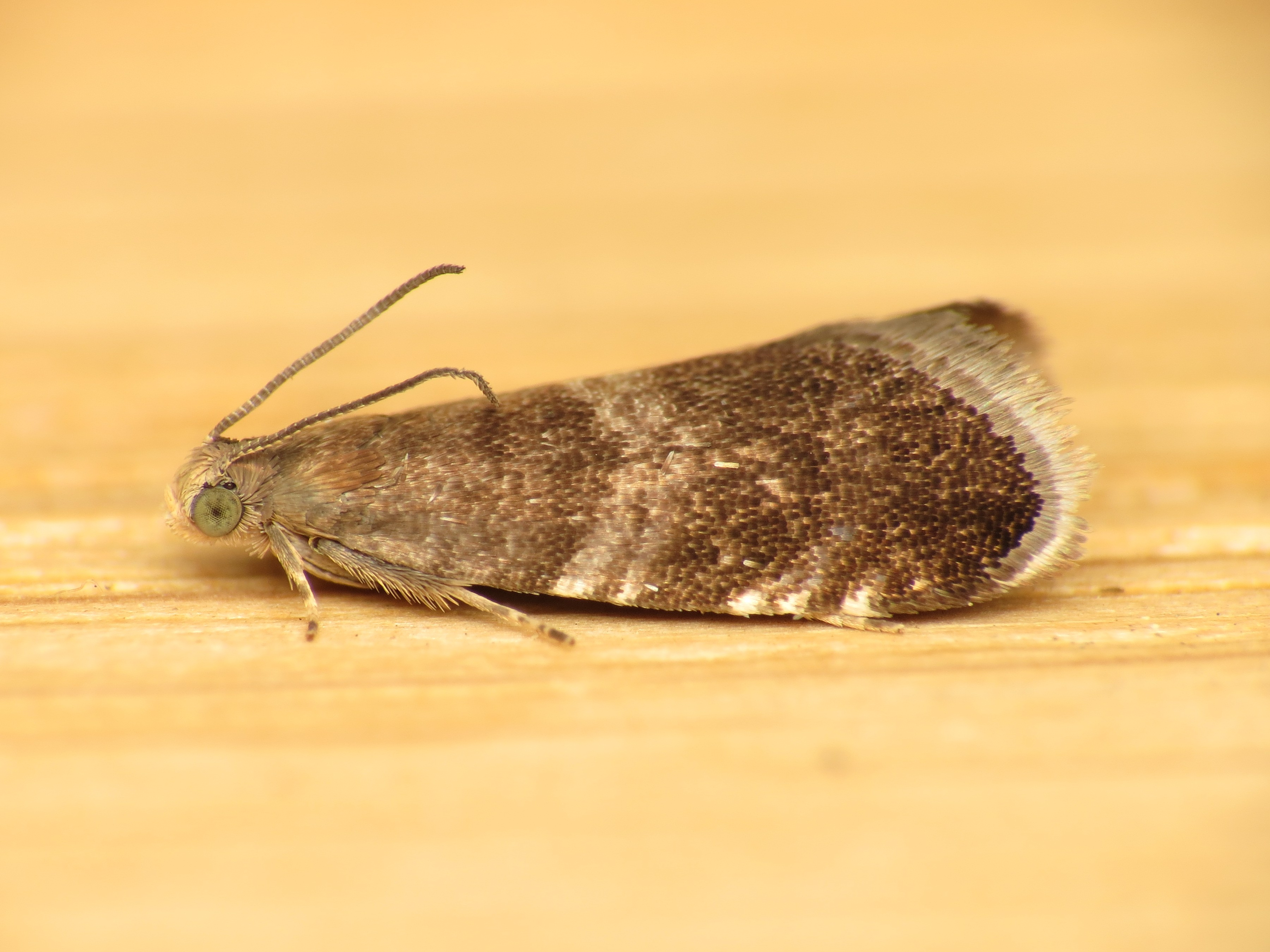

Scientific classification
- Kingdom: Animalia
- Phylum: Arthropoda
- Class: Insecta
- Order: Lepidoptera
- Family: Tortricidae
- Genus: Strophedra
- Species: S. weirana

Binomial name
- Strophedra weirana (Douglas, 1850)

Synonyms
- Stigmonota weirana Douglas, 1850

= Strophedra weirana =

Species of moth

Strophedra weirana, the little beech piercer, is a moth of the family Tortricidae. It is found in most of Europe, except the Iberian Peninsula, part of the Balkan Peninsula, Ukraine, the Baltic region, Finland and Ireland.

The wingspan is 10–12 mm. Adults are on wing in June.

The larvae feed on Fagus species. They attach two leaves of their host plant together with silk and feed from within.
