= Macrocydia =

Scientific classification
- Kingdom: Animalia
- Phylum: Arthropoda
- Class: Insecta
- Order: Lepidoptera
- Family: Tortricidae
- Subfamily: Olethreutinae
- Genus: Macrocydia; Brown & Baixeras, 2006

Genus of tortrix moths

Macrocydia is a genus of moths of the family Tortricidae.

== Species ==
- Macrocydia divergens Brown & Baixeras, 2006

== See also ==
- List of Tortricidae genera
