= Pammenopsis =

Scientific classification
- Kingdom: Animalia
- Phylum: Arthropoda
- Class: Insecta
- Order: Lepidoptera
- Family: Tortricidae
- Subfamily: Olethreutinae
- Genus: Pammenopsis; Kuznetzov, 2003

Genus of tortrix moths

Pammenopsis is a genus of moths belonging to the family Tortricidae.

== Species ==
- Pammenopsis barbata Komai & Horak, in Horak, 2006
- Pammenopsis critica (Meyrick, 1905)

== See also ==
- List of Tortricidae genera
