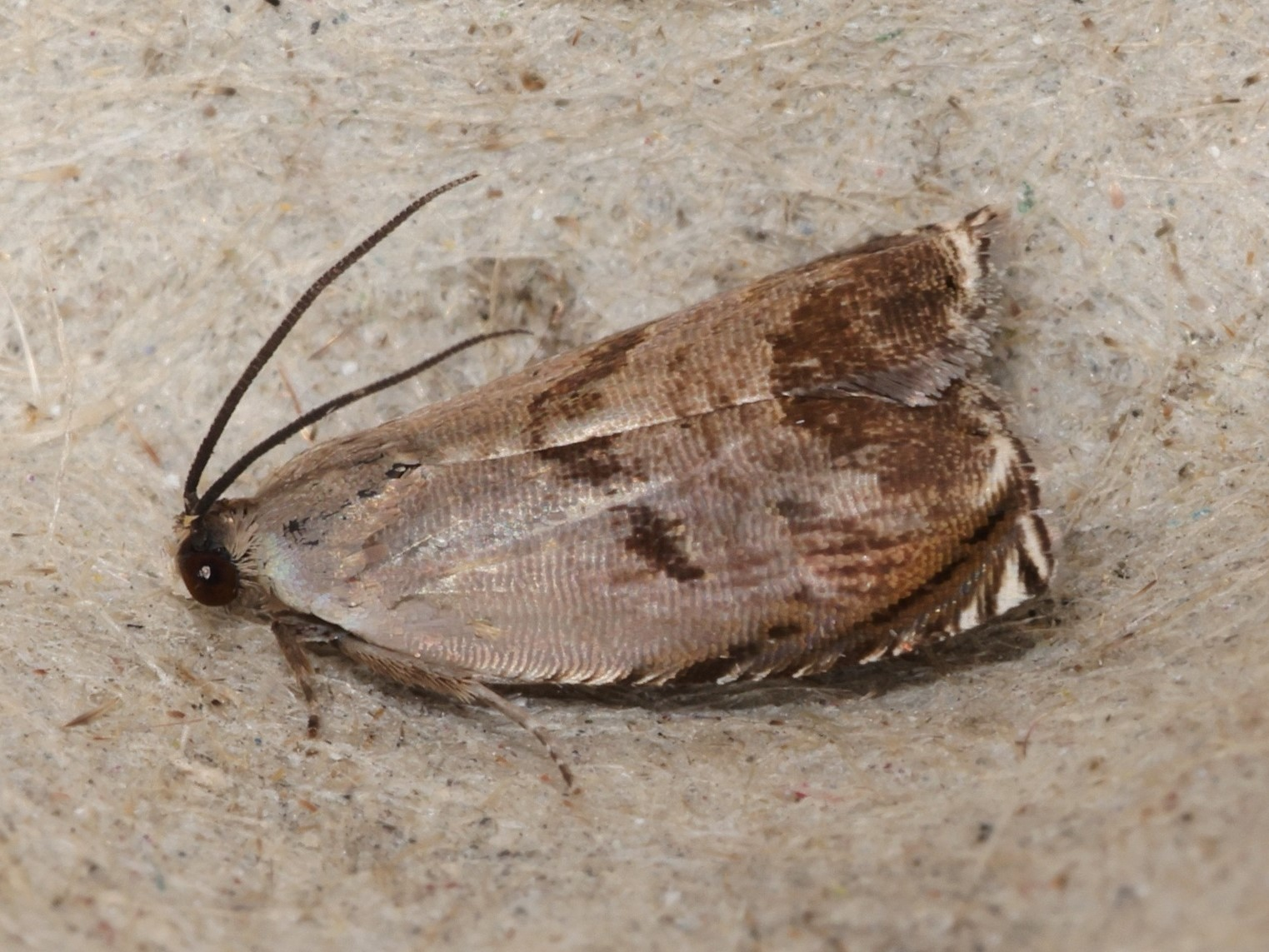
- Andrioplecta oxystaura

Scientific classification
- Domain: Eukaryota
- Kingdom: Animalia
- Phylum: Arthropoda
- Class: Insecta
- Order: Lepidoptera
- Family: Tortricidae
- Subfamily: Olethreutinae
- Genus: Andrioplecta; Obraztsov, 1968

= Andrioplecta =

Genus of tortrix moths

Andrioplecta is a genus of moths belonging to the subfamily Olethreutinae of the family Tortricidae.

== Species ==
- Andrioplecta dierli Komai, 1992
- Andrioplecta leucodora (Meyrick, 1928)
- Andrioplecta oxystaura (Meyrick, in Caradja & Meyrick, 1935)
- Andrioplecta phuluangensis Komai, 1992
- Andrioplecta pulverula (Meyrick, 1912)
- Andrioplecta rescissa (Meyrick, 1921)
- Andrioplecta shoreae Komai, 1992
- Andrioplecta suboxystaura Komai, 1992
- Andrioplecta subpulverula (Obraztsov, 1968)

== See also ==
- List of Tortricidae genera
