= Pammenemima =

Scientific classification
- Kingdom: Animalia
- Phylum: Arthropoda
- Class: Insecta
- Order: Lepidoptera
- Family: Tortricidae
- Subfamily: Olethreutinae
- Genus: Pammenemima; Diakonoff, 1982

Genus of tortrix moths

Pammenemima is a genus of moths belonging to the subfamily Olethreutinae of the family Tortricidae.

== Species ==
- Pammenemima exocentra (Meyrick, 1939)
- Pammenemima ionia (Wileman & Stringer, 1929)
- Pammenemima ochropa (Meyrick, 1905)
- Pammenemima pagerostoma (Diakonoff, 1984)
- Pammenemima plumbosana (Bradley, 1961)
- Pammenemima tetramita (Turner, 1925)

== See also ==
- List of Tortricidae genera
