= Loranthacydia =

Scientific classification
- Kingdom: Animalia
- Phylum: Arthropoda
- Class: Insecta
- Order: Lepidoptera
- Family: Tortricidae
- Subfamily: Olethreutinae
- Genus: Loranthacydia; Horak, Common & Komai, 1996

Genus of tortrix moths

Loranthacydia is a genus of moths belonging to the family Tortricidae.

== Species ==
- Loranthacydia aulacodes (Lower, 1902)
- Loranthacydia metallocosma (Lower, 1902)
- Loranthacydia multilinea (Turner, 1945)
- Loranthacydia pessota (Meyrick, 1911)
- Loranthacydia sinapichroa (Turner, 1926)

== See also ==
- List of Tortricidae genera
