= Notocydia =

Scientific classification
- Kingdom: Animalia
- Phylum: Arthropoda
- Class: Insecta
- Order: Lepidoptera
- Family: Tortricidae
- Subfamily: Olethreutinae
- Genus: Notocydia; Komai & Horak, 2006

Genus of tortrix moths

Notocydia is a genus of moths of the family Tortricidae.

== Species ==
- Notocydia atripunctis (Turner, 1946)
- Notocydia lomacula (Lower, 1899)
- Notocydia niveimacula Komai & Horak, in Horak, 2006
- Notocydia tephraea (Meyrick, 1911)

== See also ==
- List of Tortricidae genera
