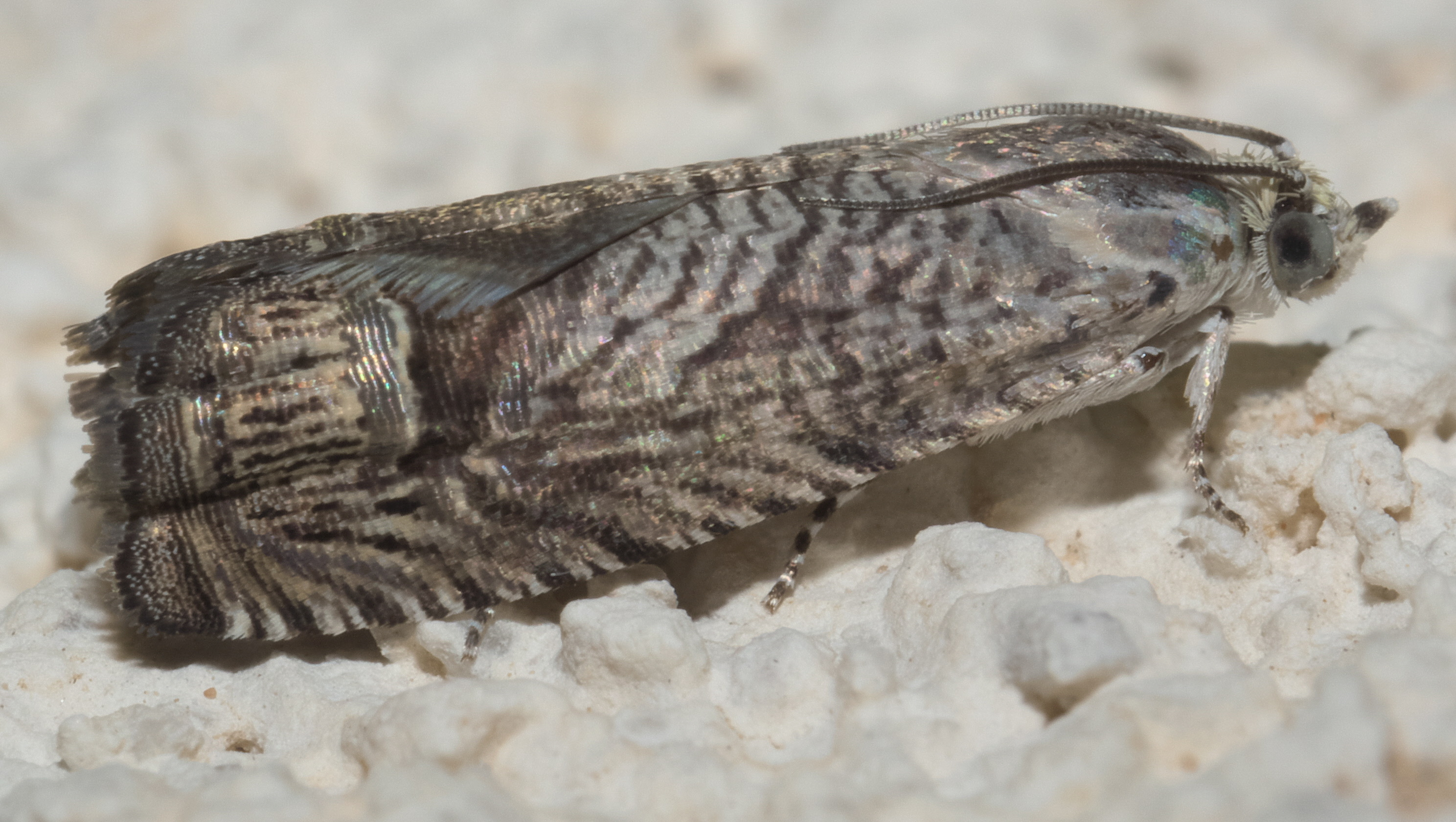
- Ofatulena duodecemstriata

Scientific classification
- Kingdom: Animalia
- Phylum: Arthropoda
- Class: Insecta
- Order: Lepidoptera
- Family: Tortricidae
- Subfamily: Olethreutinae
- Genus: Ofatulena; Heinrich, 1926

= Ofatulena =

Genus of tortrix moths

Ofatulena is a genus of moths belonging to the family Tortricidae.

== Species ==
- Ofatulena duodecemstriata (Walsingham, 1884)
- Ofatulena jamaicana (Walsingham, 1897)
- Ofatulena luminosa Heinrich, 1926

== See also ==
- List of Tortricidae genera
