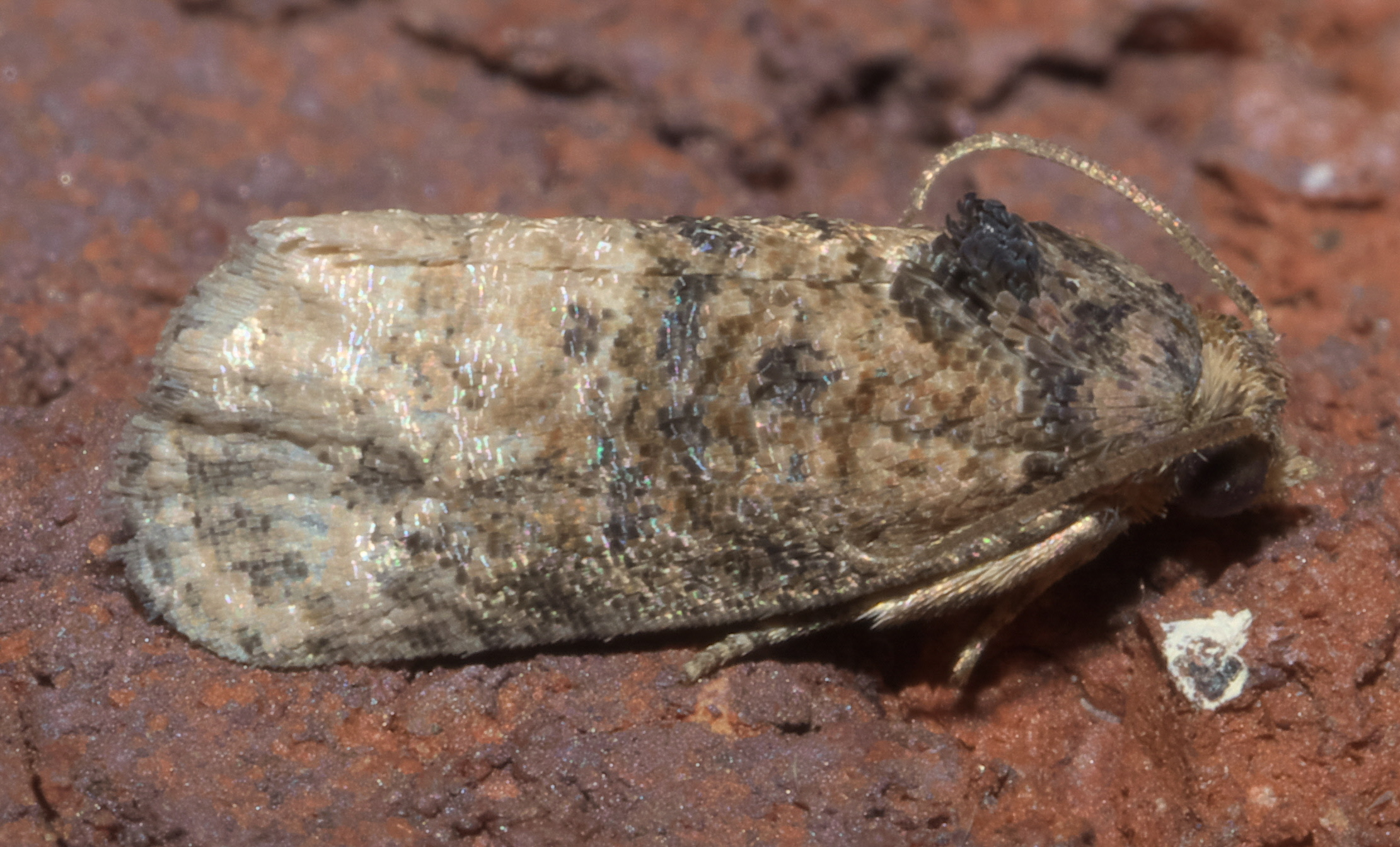
- Ecdytolopha mana

Scientific classification
- Kingdom: Animalia
- Phylum: Arthropoda
- Clade: Pancrustacea
- Class: Insecta
- Order: Lepidoptera
- Family: Tortricidae
- Subfamily: Olethreutinae
- Genus: Ecdytolopha; Zeller, 1875

= Ecdytolopha =

Genus of tortrix moths

Ecdytolopha is a genus of moths belonging to the subfamily Olethreutinae of the family Tortricidae.

== Species ==
- Ecdytolopha beckeri Adamski & Brown, 2001
- Ecdytolopha coloradana Adamski & Brown, 2001
- Ecdytolopha exploramae Adamski & Brown, 2001
- Ecdytolopha holodesma (Walsingham, 1914)
- Ecdytolopha insiticiana Zeller, 1875
- Ecdytolopha leonana Adamski & Brown, 2001
- Ecdytolopha mana (Kearfott, 1907)
- Ecdytolopha occidentana Adamski & Brown, 2001
- Ecdytolopha ricana Adamski & Brown, 2001
- Ecdytolopha sinaloana Adamski & Brown, 2001

== See also ==
- List of Tortricidae genera
