= Pelochrista ornata =

Scientific classification
- Domain: Eukaryota
- Kingdom: Animalia
- Phylum: Arthropoda
- Class: Insecta
- Order: Lepidoptera
- Family: Tortricidae
- Genus: Pelochrista
- Species: P. ornata

Binomial name
- Pelochrista ornata Kuznetsov, 1967

Species of moth

Pelochrista ornata is a species of moth of the family Tortricidae. It is found in China (Shanghai, Jiangsu) and Russia.

The larvae feed on Artemisia gmelinii.
