= Pelochrista mollitana =

Scientific classification
- Kingdom: Animalia
- Phylum: Arthropoda
- Clade: Pancrustacea
- Class: Insecta
- Order: Lepidoptera
- Family: Tortricidae
- Genus: Pelochrista
- Species: P. mollitana

Binomial name
- Pelochrista mollitana (Zeller, 1847)

Species of moth

Pelochrista mollitana is a moth belonging to the family Tortricidae. The species was first described by Philipp Christoph Zeller in 1847.

It is native to Europe.
