= Pelochrista agrestana =

Scientific classification
- Domain: Eukaryota
- Kingdom: Animalia
- Phylum: Arthropoda
- Class: Insecta
- Order: Lepidoptera
- Family: Tortricidae
- Genus: Pelochrista
- Species: P. agrestana

Binomial name
- Pelochrista agrestana (Treitschke, 1830)

Species of moth

Pelochrista agrestana is a species of moth belonging to the family Tortricidae.

Synonym:

- Sciaphila agrestana Treitschke, 1830 (= basionym)
