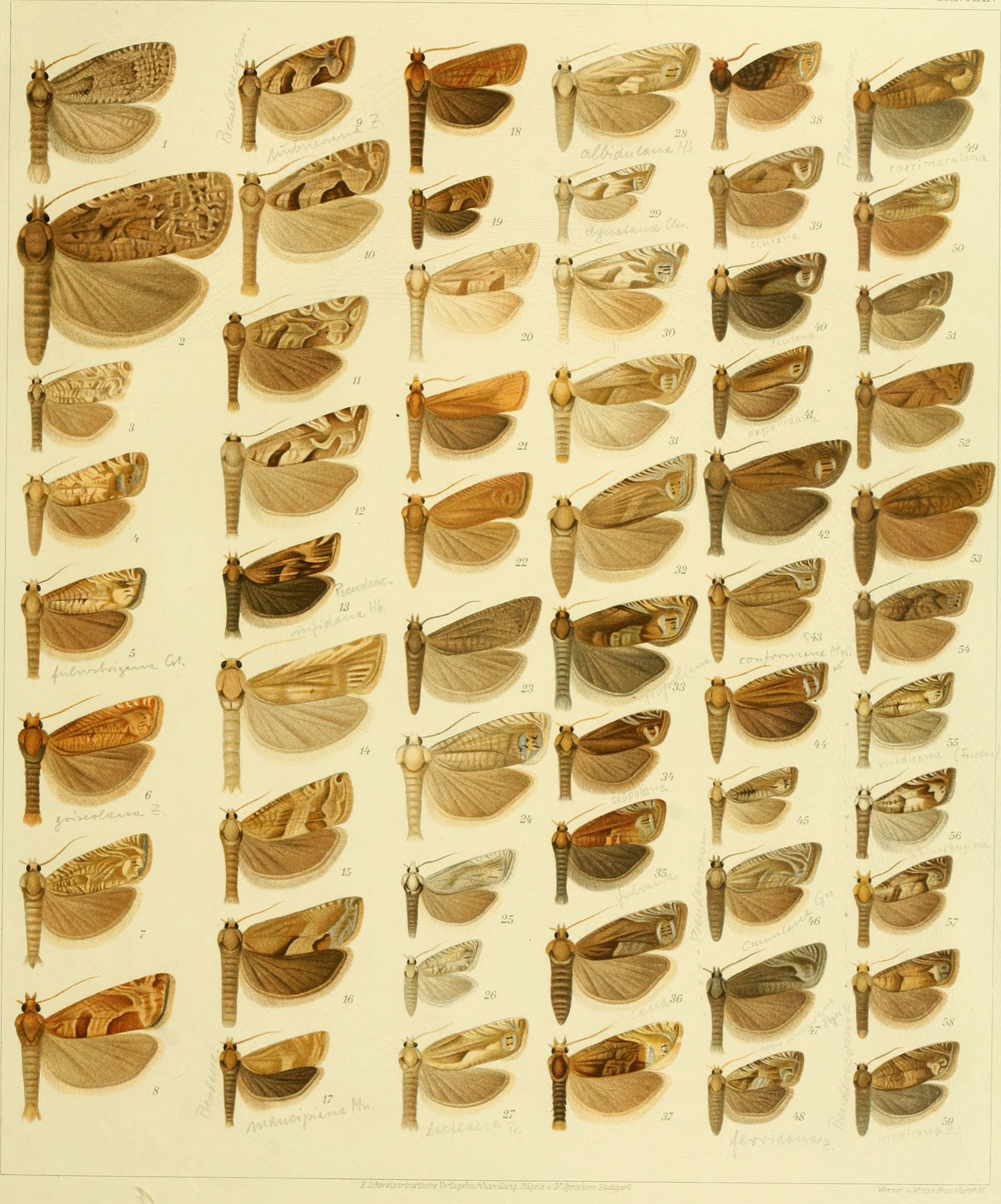
- Epiblema disquei in Kennel Die palaearktischen tortriciden figure 10 male

Scientific classification
- Domain: Eukaryota
- Kingdom: Animalia
- Phylum: Arthropoda
- Class: Insecta
- Order: Lepidoptera
- Family: Tortricidae
- Genus: Pelochrista
- Species: P. disquei

Binomial name
- Pelochrista disquei (Kennel, 1901)

Synonyms
- Epiblema disquei Kennel, 1901; Pelochrista (Pseudeucosma) congeminata Obraztsov, 1967

= Pelochrista disquei =

Species of moth

Pelochrista disquei is a species of moth of the family Tortricidae. It is found in China and Mongolia.
