= Pelochrista tibetana =

Scientific classification
- Domain: Eukaryota
- Kingdom: Animalia
- Phylum: Arthropoda
- Class: Insecta
- Order: Lepidoptera
- Family: Tortricidae
- Genus: Pelochrista
- Species: P. tibetana

Binomial name
- Pelochrista tibetana (Caradja, 1939)

Synonyms
- Epiblema tibetana Caradja, 1939

Species of moth

Pelochrista tibetana is a species of moth of the family Tortricidae. It is found in China (Tibet, Sichuan).
