= Pelochrista buddhana =

Scientific classification
- Kingdom: Animalia
- Phylum: Arthropoda
- Class: Insecta
- Order: Lepidoptera
- Family: Tortricidae
- Genus: Pelochrista
- Species: P. buddhana

Binomial name
- Pelochrista buddhana (Kennel, 1919)

Synonyms
- Epiblema buddhana Kennel, 1919

Species of moth

Pelochrista buddhana is a species of moth of the family Tortricidae. It is found in Mongolia and western China.
