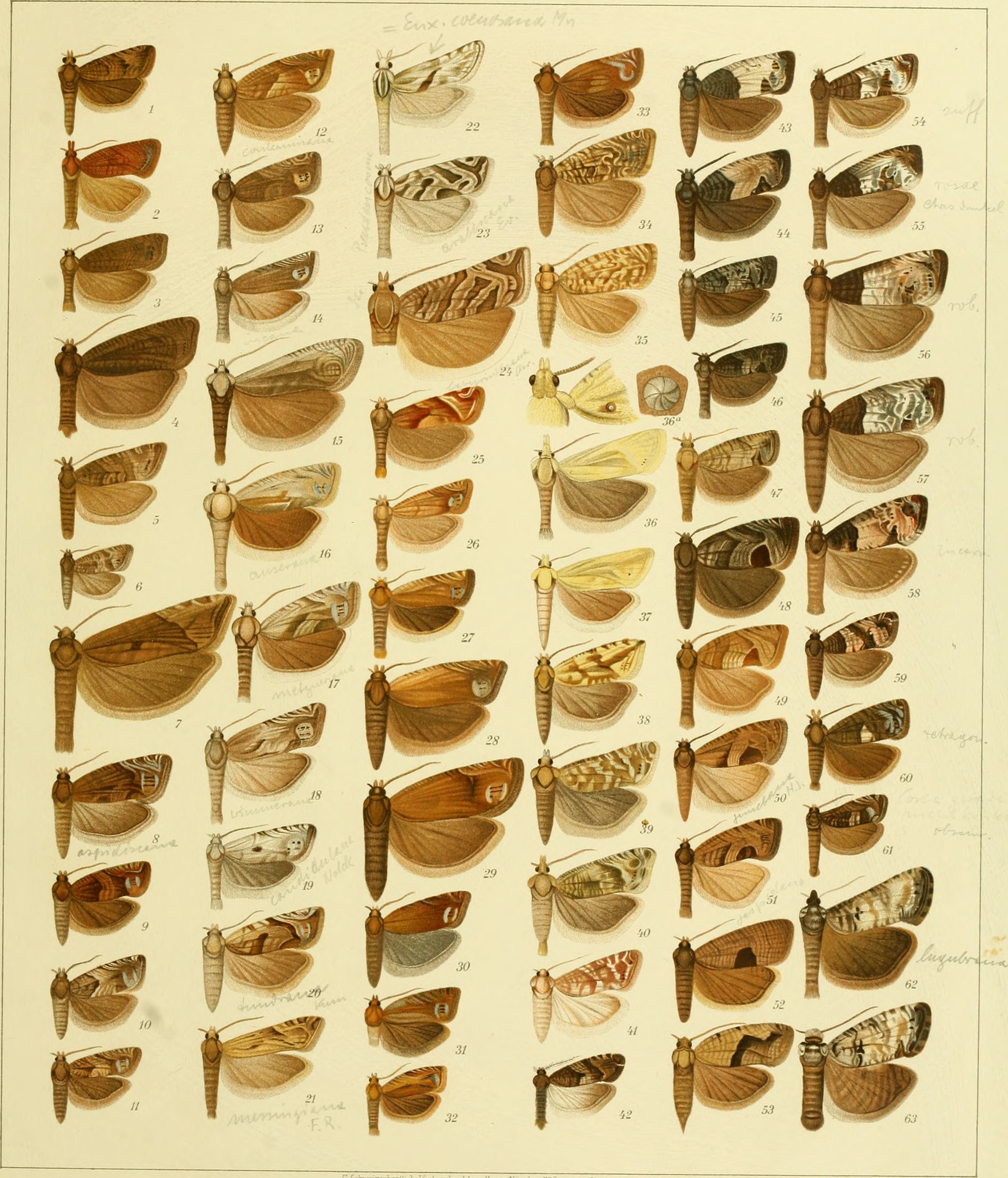
- Pelochrista arabescana in Kennel Die palaearktischen tortriciden figure 23 male

Scientific classification
- Kingdom: Animalia
- Phylum: Arthropoda
- Clade: Pancrustacea
- Class: Insecta
- Order: Lepidoptera
- Family: Tortricidae
- Genus: Pelochrista
- Species: P. arabescana

Binomial name
- Pelochrista arabescana (Eversmann, 1844)

Synonyms
- Cochylis arabescana Eversmann, 1844

= Pelochrista arabescana =

Species of moth

Pelochrista arabescana is a species of moth of the family Tortricidae. It is found in China (Hebei, Shanxi, Inner Mongolia, Jilin, Gansu, Qinghai, Ningxia), Mongolia, Iran, Kazakhstan and Europe, where it has been recorded from Hungary, Romania, Russia and Ukraine.

The wingspan is 14–20 mm. Adults have been recorded on wing from June to August.

The larvae feed on Artemisia species.
