= Veratric acid =

Names
- IUPAC name 3,4-Dimethoxybenzoic acid
- Other names Dimethylprotocatechuic acid

Identifiers
CAS Number	93-07-2
3D model (JSmol)	Interactive image
ChEBI	CHEBI:296881
ChEMBL	ChEMBL118903
ChemSpider	6854
ECHA InfoCard	100.002.015
EC Number	202-215-7
Gmelin Reference	1007934
PubChem CID	7121
RTECS number	DG8598750
UNII	1YY04E7RR4
CompTox Dashboard (EPA)	DTXSID6059077
- InChI: InChI=1S/C9H10O4/c1-12-7-4-3-6(9(10)11)5-8(7)13-2/h3-5H,1-2H3,(H,10,11) Key: DAUAQNGYDSHRET-UHFFFAOYSA-N
- SMILES: COC1=C(C=C(C=C1)C(=O)O)OC

Properties
Chemical formula	C_{9}H_{10}O_{4}
Molar mass	182.175 g·mol^{−1}
- Except where otherwise noted, data are given for materials in their standard state (at 25 °C [77 °F], 100 kPa). Infobox references

Veratric acid, also known as 3,4-dimethoxybenzoic acid, is a benzoic acid. It is a plant metabolite found in species such as Hypericum laricifolium, Artemisia sacrorum, and Zeyheria montana.

== Uses ==
=== Medical research ===
A 2023 study at SRM Institute of Science and Technology suggests that veratric acid has apoptotic and antiproliferative effects against triple negative breast cancer cells. These effects were substantially increased when polydopamine nanoparticles were used as a sustained release drug carrier.
