= Pelochrista frustata =

Scientific classification
- Domain: Eukaryota
- Kingdom: Animalia
- Phylum: Arthropoda
- Class: Insecta
- Order: Lepidoptera
- Family: Tortricidae
- Genus: Pelochrista
- Species: P. frustata

Binomial name
- Pelochrista frustata Razowski, 2006

Species of moth

Pelochrista frustata is a species of moth of the family Tortricidae. It is found in India (Jammu and Kashmir).
