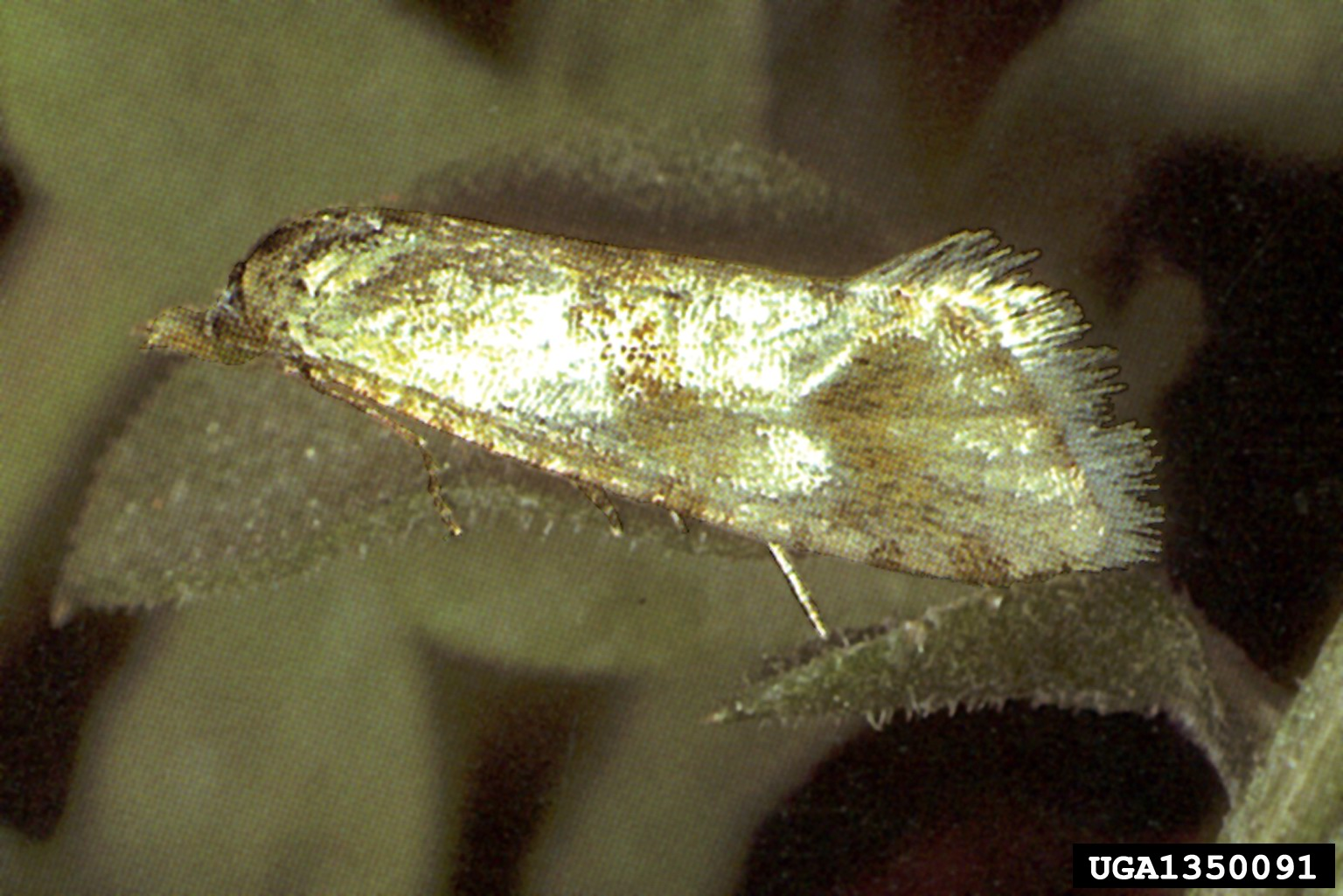

Scientific classification
- Kingdom: Animalia
- Phylum: Arthropoda
- Clade: Pancrustacea
- Class: Insecta
- Order: Lepidoptera
- Family: Tortricidae
- Genus: Pelochrista
- Species: P. medullana

Binomial name
- Pelochrista medullana (Staudinger, 1880)

Synonyms
- Grapholitha medullana Staudinger, 1880

= Pelochrista medullana =

Species of moth

Pelochrista medullana, the brown-winged root moth, is a moth of the family Tortricidae. It is native to central Europe, Turkey, southern Russia, Iran and China (Xinjiang). In North America, it has been introduced to Idaho, Montana, Oregon and British Columbia. Introduction in the United States was approved in 1984.

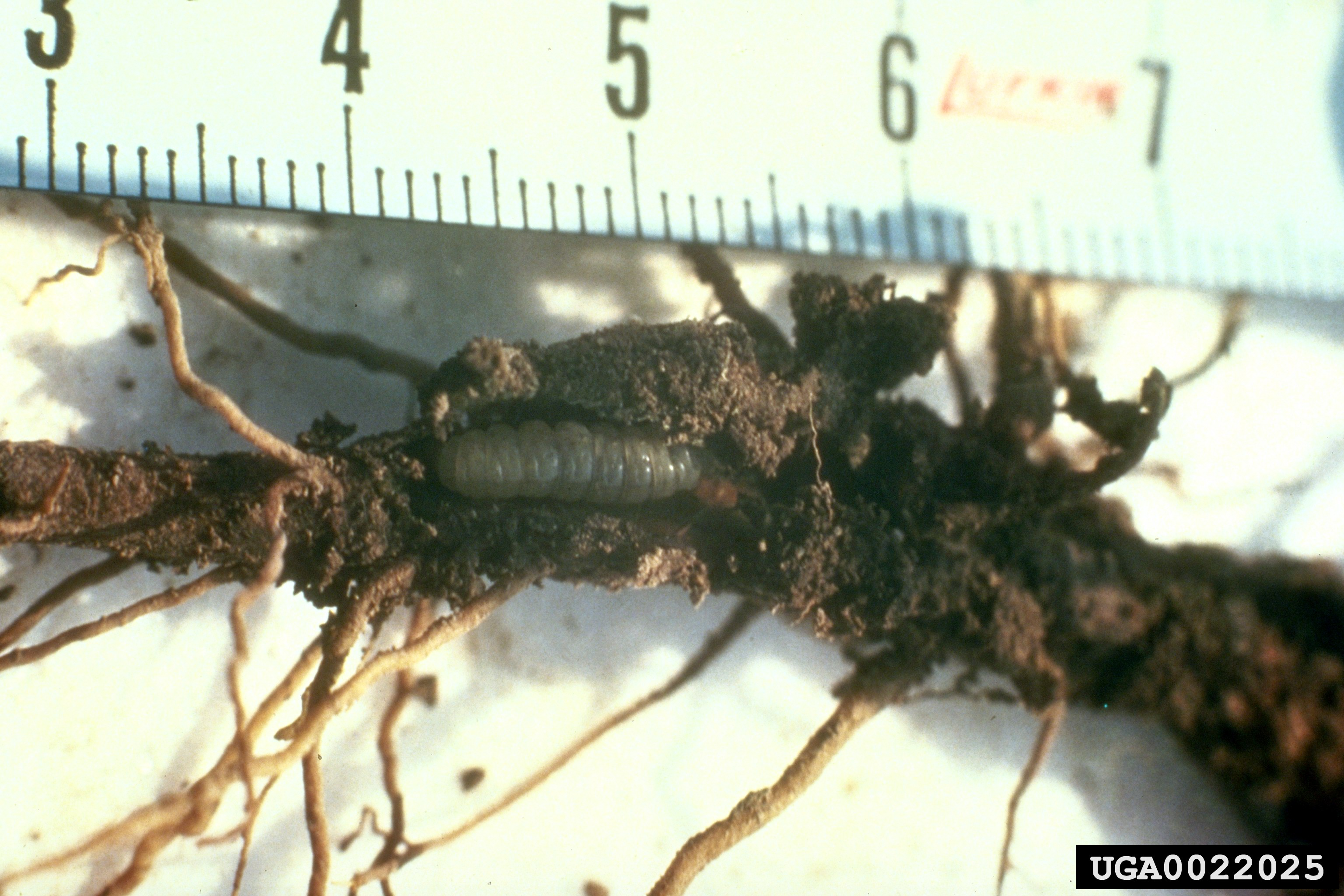
Larva

The wingspan is 14–21 mm. Adults are on wing from mid-June to the end of July. There is one generation per year.
