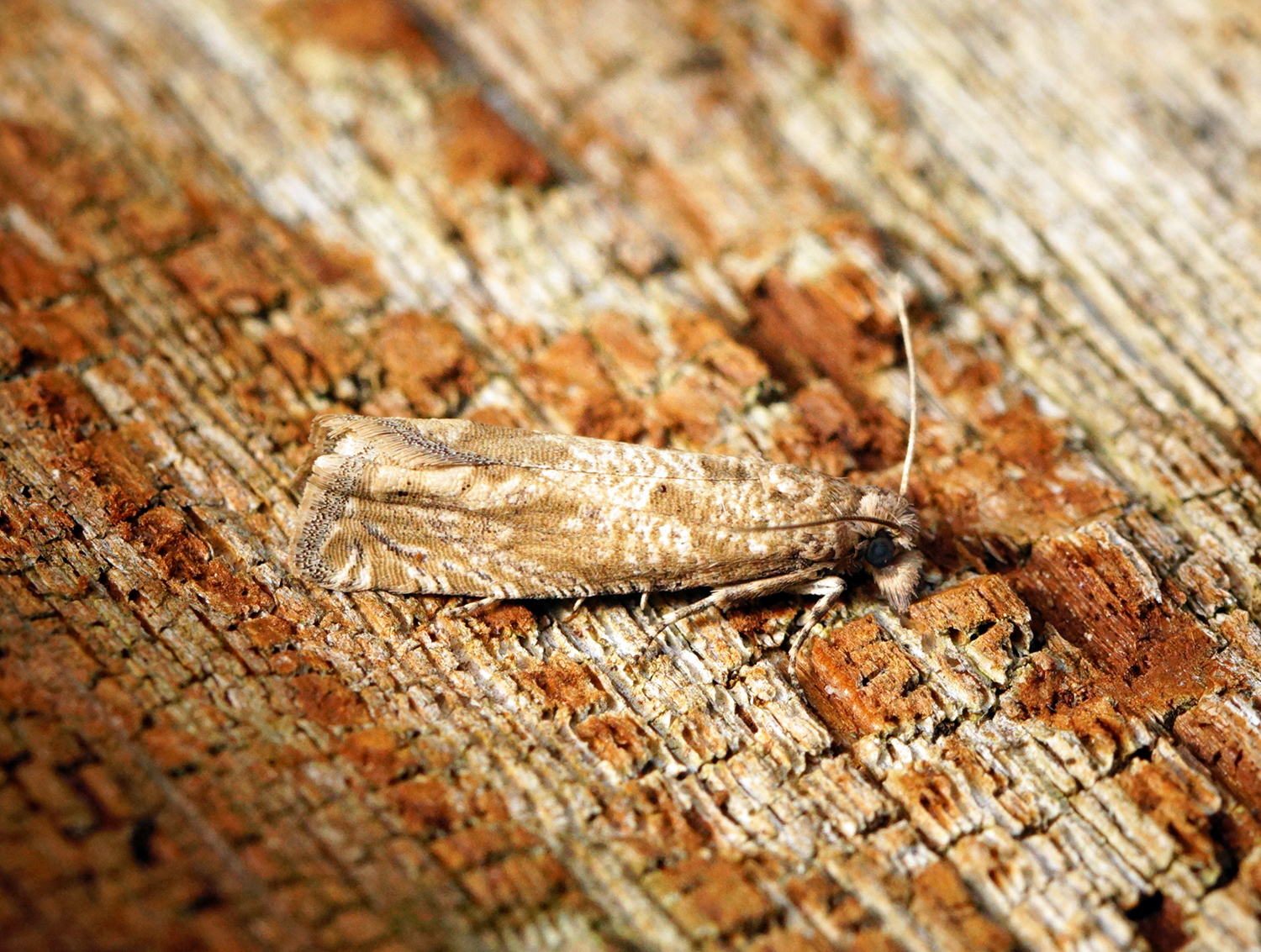

Scientific classification
- Kingdom: Animalia
- Phylum: Arthropoda
- Clade: Pancrustacea
- Class: Insecta
- Order: Lepidoptera
- Family: Tortricidae
- Genus: Pelochrista
- Species: P. caecimaculana

Binomial name
- Pelochrista caecimaculana (Hübner, 1799)

= Pelochrista caecimaculana =

Species of moth

Pelochrista caecimaculana is a moth belonging to the family Tortricidae. The species was first described by Jacob Hübner in 1799.

It is native to Eurasia.
