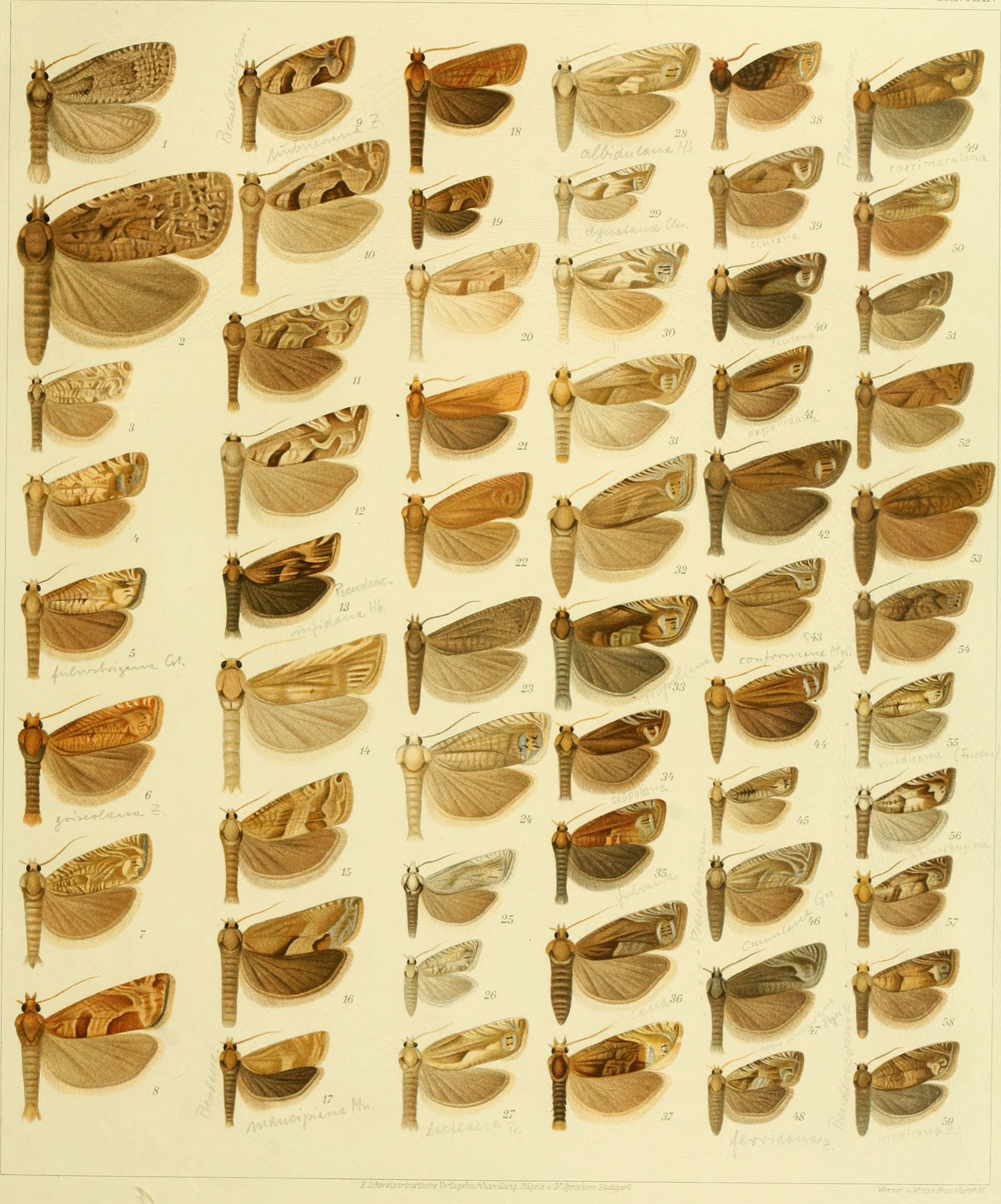
- Pelochrista infidana moth

Scientific classification
- Kingdom: Animalia
- Phylum: Arthropoda
- Clade: Pancrustacea
- Class: Insecta
- Order: Lepidoptera
- Family: Tortricidae
- Genus: Pelochrista
- Species: P. infidana

Binomial name
- Pelochrista infidana (Hübner, 1824)

= Pelochrista infidana =

Species of moth

Pelochrista infidana is a moth belonging to the family Tortricidae. The species was first described by Jacob Hübner in 1824.

It is native to Europe.
