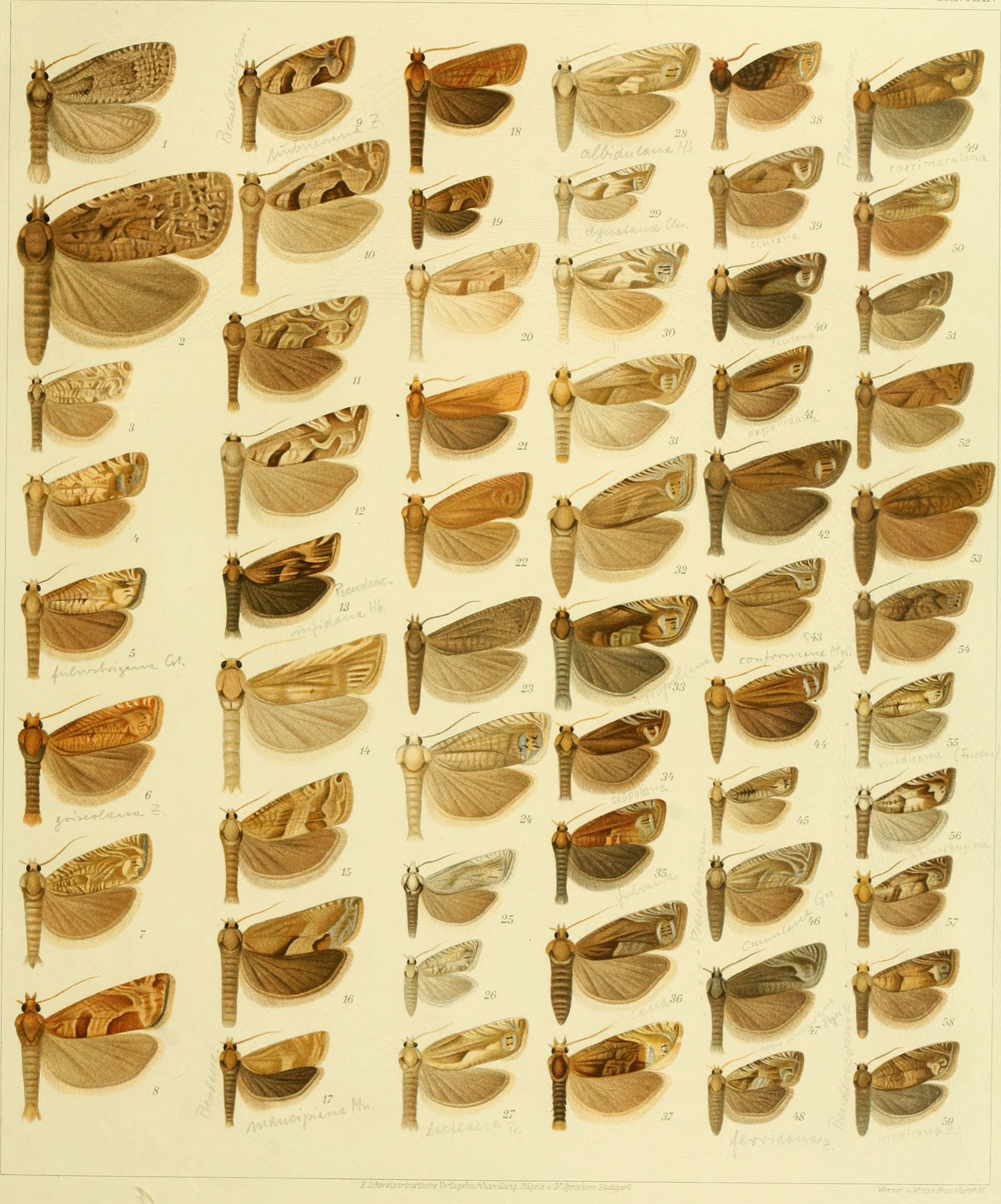
- Pelochrista umbraculana in Kennel Die palaearktischen tortriciden figure 14 male and 52 male (as iniquana Kennel)

Scientific classification
- Domain: Eukaryota
- Kingdom: Animalia
- Phylum: Arthropoda
- Class: Insecta
- Order: Lepidoptera
- Family: Tortricidae
- Genus: Pelochrista
- Species: P. umbraculana

Binomial name
- Pelochrista umbraculana (Eversmann, 1844)

Synonyms
- Teras umbraculana Eversmann, 1844; Epiblema inignana Kennel, 1901; Epiblema iniquana Kennel, 1921; Grapholitha subterminana Erschoff, 1877

= Pelochrista umbraculana =

Species of moth

Pelochrista umbraculana is a species of moth of the family Tortricidae. It is found in China, Mongolia, Japan and Russia.

The wingspan is 17–23 mm. Adults have been recorded on wing from June to September.

== Subspecies ==
- Pelochrista umbraculana umbraculana
- Pelochrista umbraculana inignana (Kennel, 1901) (China, Mongolia, Japan, Russia)
