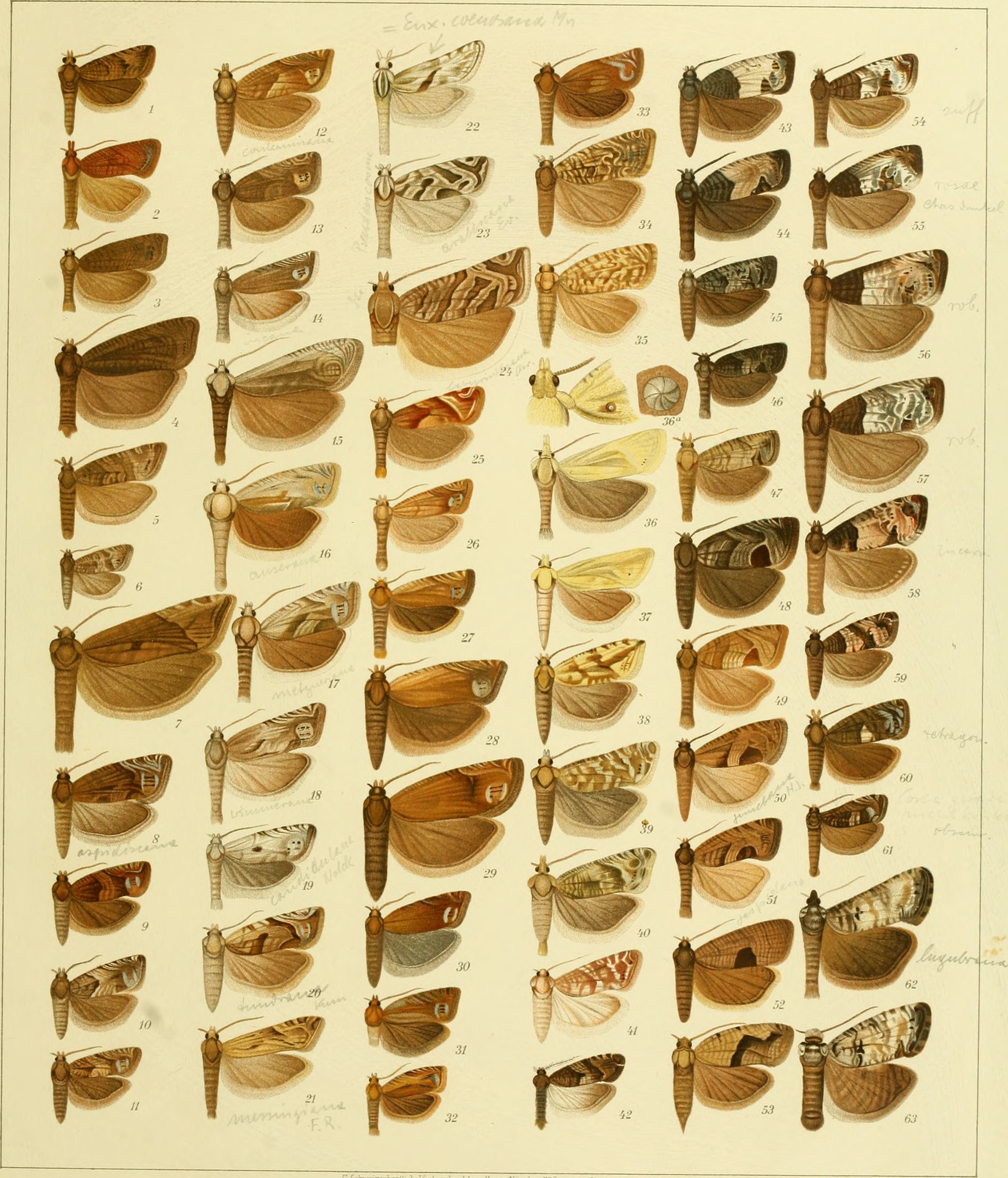
- Pelochrista labyrinthicana in Kennel Die palaearktischen tortriciden figure 24 male

Scientific classification
- Domain: Eukaryota
- Kingdom: Animalia
- Phylum: Arthropoda
- Class: Insecta
- Order: Lepidoptera
- Family: Tortricidae
- Genus: Pelochrista
- Species: P. labyrinthicana

Binomial name
- Pelochrista labyrinthicana (Christoph, 1872)

Synonyms
- Grapholitha labyrinthicana Christoph, 1872

= Pelochrista labyrinthicana =

Species of moth

Pelochrista labyrinthicana is a species of moth of the family Tortricidae. It is found in China (Xinjiang), Russia, Kazakhstan, Turkmenistan, Tajikistan, where it has been recorded from Romania and Ukraine.

The wingspan is 20–25 mm. Adults have been recorded on wing in August.
