= Pelochrista tolerans =

Scientific classification
- Kingdom: Animalia
- Phylum: Arthropoda
- Class: Insecta
- Order: Lepidoptera
- Family: Tortricidae
- Genus: Pelochrista
- Species: P. tolerans

Binomial name
- Pelochrista tolerans (Meyrick, 1930)

Synonyms
- Eucosma tolerans Meyrick, 1930

Species of moth

Pelochrista tolerans is a species of moth of the family Tortricidae. It is found in Tibet, China.
