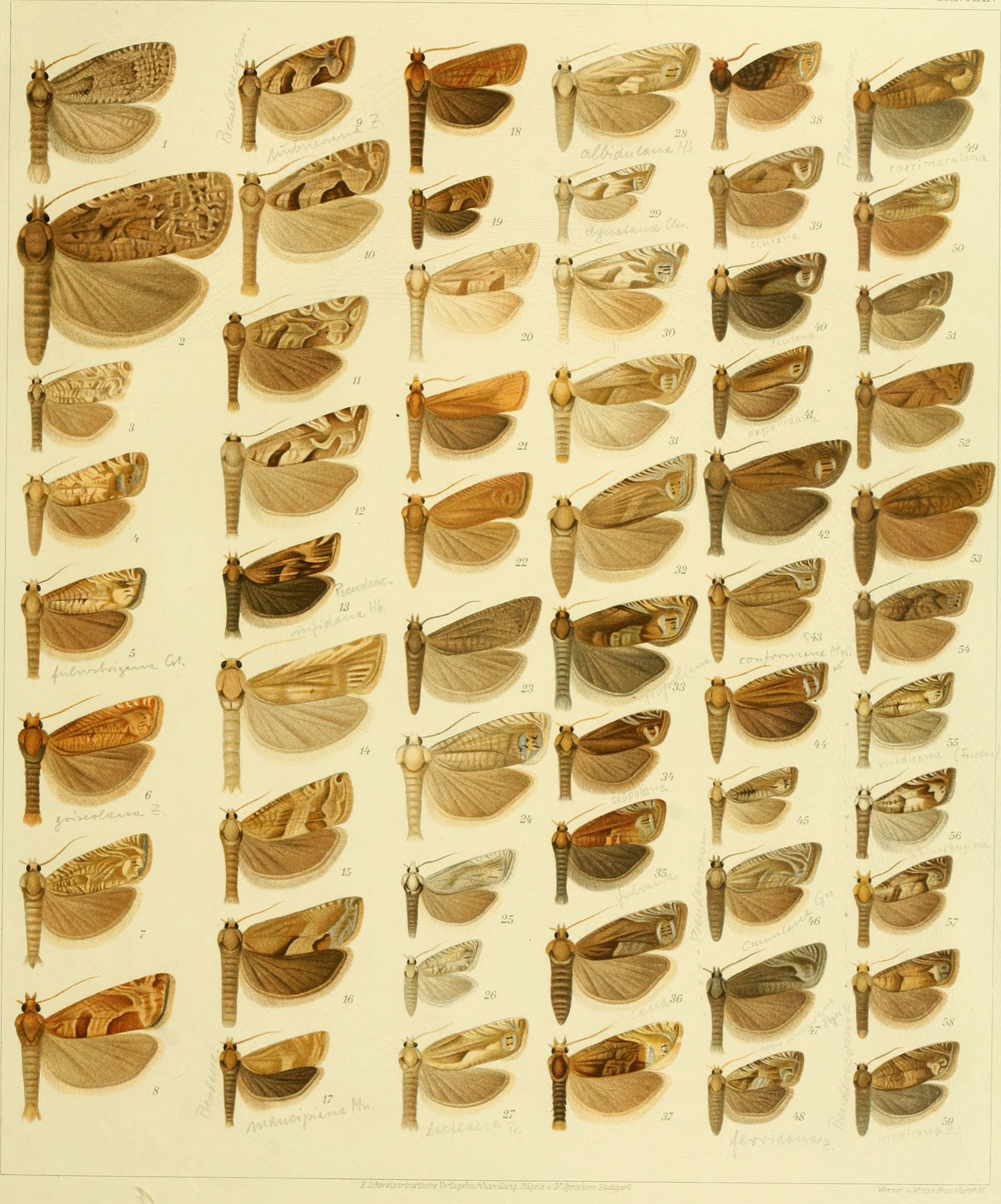
- Pelochrista decolorana in Kennel Die palaearktischen tortriciden figure 45 male

Scientific classification
- Domain: Eukaryota
- Kingdom: Animalia
- Phylum: Arthropoda
- Class: Insecta
- Order: Lepidoptera
- Family: Tortricidae
- Genus: Pelochrista
- Species: P. decolorana

Binomial name
- Pelochrista decolorana (Freyer, 1842)

Synonyms
- Paedisca decolorana Freyer, 1842

= Pelochrista decolorana =

Species of moth

Pelochrista decolorana is a species of moth of the family Tortricidae. It is found in China (Tianjin, Hebei, Inner Mongolia, Heilongjiang, Anhui, Henan, Shaanxi, Gansu, Xinjiang), Mongolia, Korea, Japan, Russia and Europe, where it has been recorded from Sicily, Spain, France, Germany, Austria, Slovakia, Bulgaria, Hungary, Romania, Poland and Ukraine.

The wingspan is 11–16 mm. Adults have been recorded on wing from May to July.

The larvae feed on Solidago species. Larvae can be found from September to October.
