= Pelochrista teleopa =

Scientific classification
- Domain: Eukaryota
- Kingdom: Animalia
- Phylum: Arthropoda
- Class: Insecta
- Order: Lepidoptera
- Family: Tortricidae
- Genus: Pelochrista
- Species: P. teleopa

Binomial name
- Pelochrista teleopa Razowski, 2006

Synonyms
- Pelochrista telopea Razowski, 2006

Species of moth

Pelochrista teleopa is a species of moth of the family Tortricidae. It is found in Jammu and Kashmir, India.

The wingspan is about 19 millimetres (0.75 in).
