= Zeyheria montana =

Scientific classification
- Kingdom: Plantae
- Clade: Tracheophytes
- Clade: Angiosperms
- Clade: Eudicots
- Clade: Asterids
- Order: Lamiales
- Family: Bignoniaceae
- Genus: Zeyheria
- Species: Z. montana

Binomial name
- Zeyheria montana Mart.

Species of tree

Zeyheria montana, also known as Zeyhera montana or Zeyheria digitalis, is a tree in the family Bignoniaceae that is native to dry areas of Brazil and East Bolivia.

== Chemistry ==
The stems of Z. montana contain D-glucose, vanillic acid, veratric acid, and dilignols including zeyherol and lapachol.
