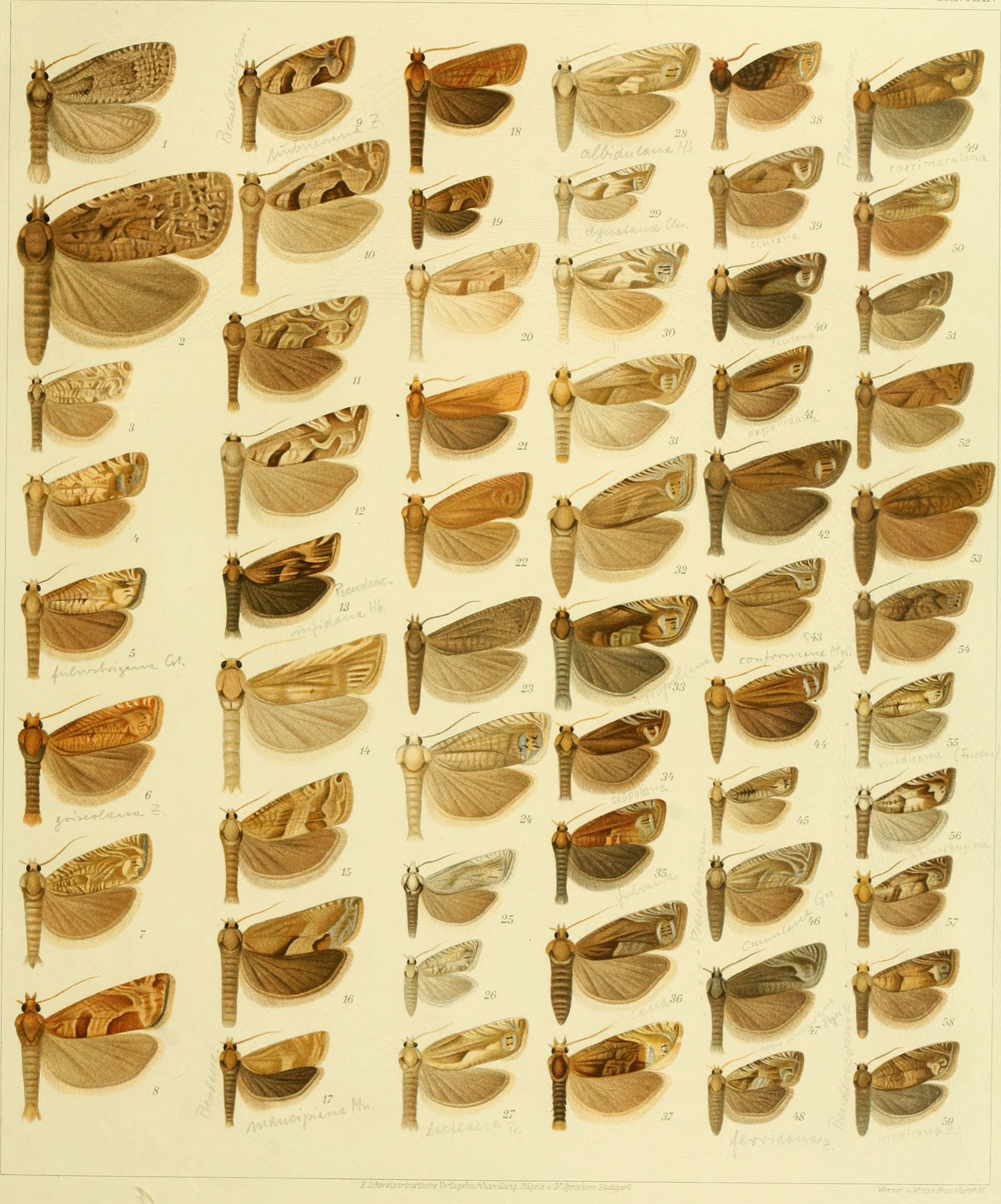
- Pelochrista apheliana in Kennel Die palaearktischen tortriciden figure 22 female

Scientific classification
- Domain: Eukaryota
- Kingdom: Animalia
- Phylum: Arthropoda
- Class: Insecta
- Order: Lepidoptera
- Family: Tortricidae
- Genus: Pelochrista
- Species: P. apheliana

Binomial name
- Pelochrista apheliana (Kennel, 1901)

Synonyms
- Epiblema apheliana Kennel, 1901; Epiblema corneliana Kennel, 1919

= Pelochrista apheliana =

Species of moth

Pelochrista apheliana is a species of moth of the family Tortricidae. It is found in western China, Mongolia, Kazakhstan and Europe, where it has been recorded from Romania and Russia.

The wingspan is 16–21 mm. Adults have been recorded on wing in June and July.
