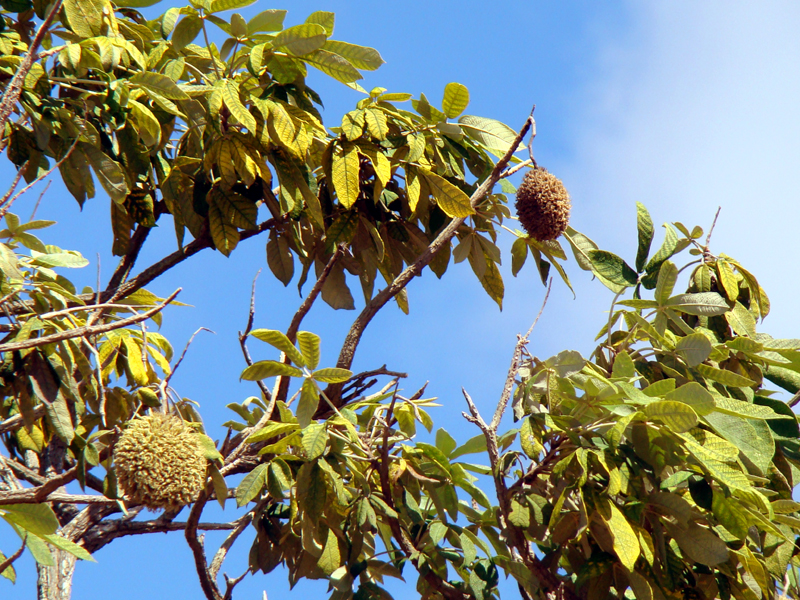
- Zeyheria tuberculosa

Scientific classification
- Kingdom: Plantae
- Clade: Tracheophytes
- Clade: Angiosperms
- Clade: Eudicots
- Clade: Asterids
- Order: Lamiales
- Family: Bignoniaceae
- Clade: Crescentiina
- Clade: Tabebuia alliance
- Genus: Zeyheria; Mart.

Synonyms
- Zeyhera

= Zeyheria =

Genus of flowering plants

Zeyheria is a genus of plants in the family Bignoniaceae.

Species include:

- Zeyheria montana
- Zeyheria tuberculosa Burman
