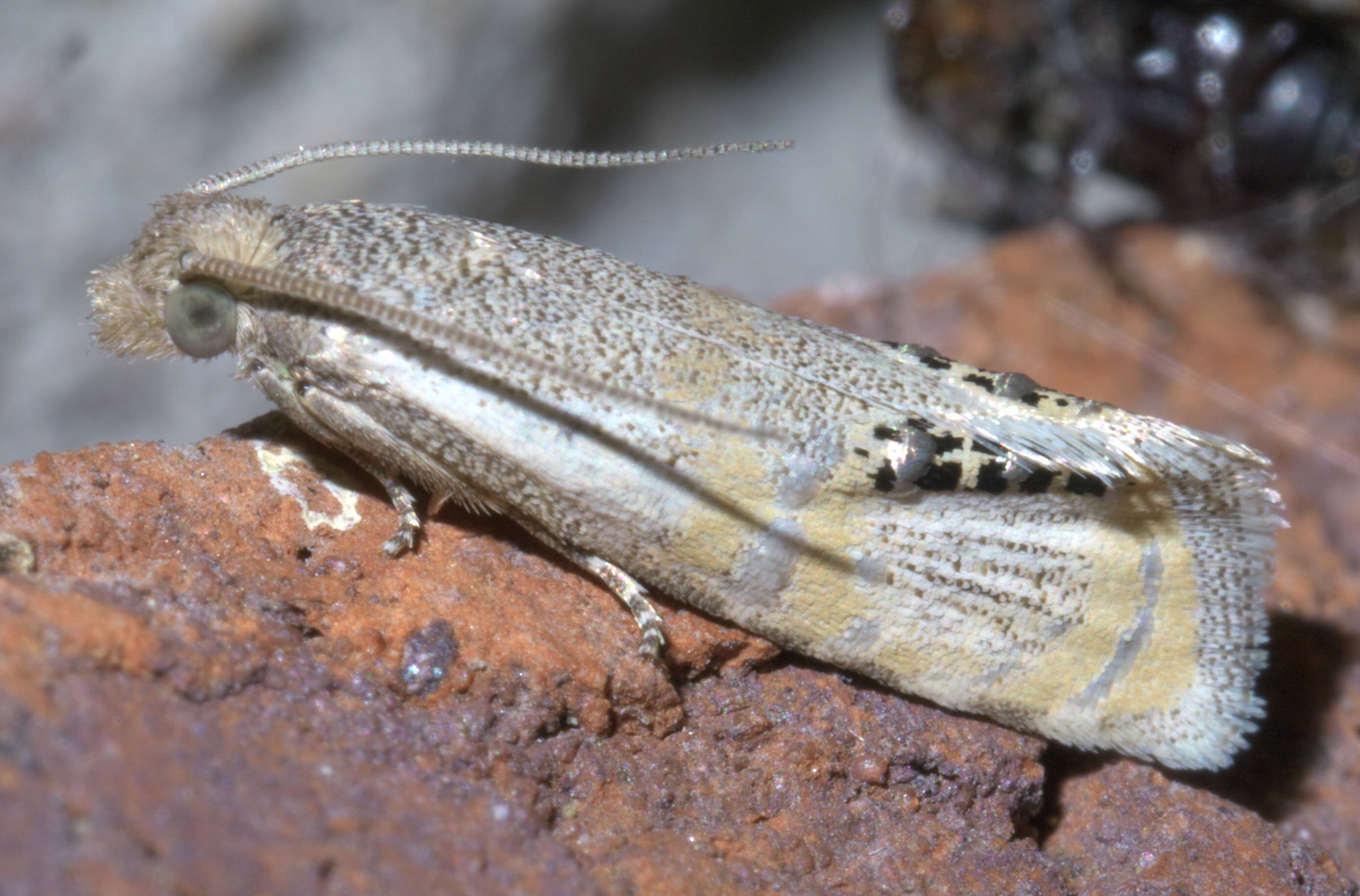

Scientific classification
- Kingdom: Animalia
- Phylum: Arthropoda
- Clade: Pancrustacea
- Class: Insecta
- Order: Lepidoptera
- Family: Tortricidae
- Genus: Pelochrista
- Species: P. scintillana

Binomial name
- Pelochrista scintillana (Clemens, 1865)

= Pelochrista scintillana =

Species of moth

Pelochrista scintillana is a species of tortricid moth in the family Tortricidae.

The MONA or Hodges number for Pelochrista scintillana is 3151.
