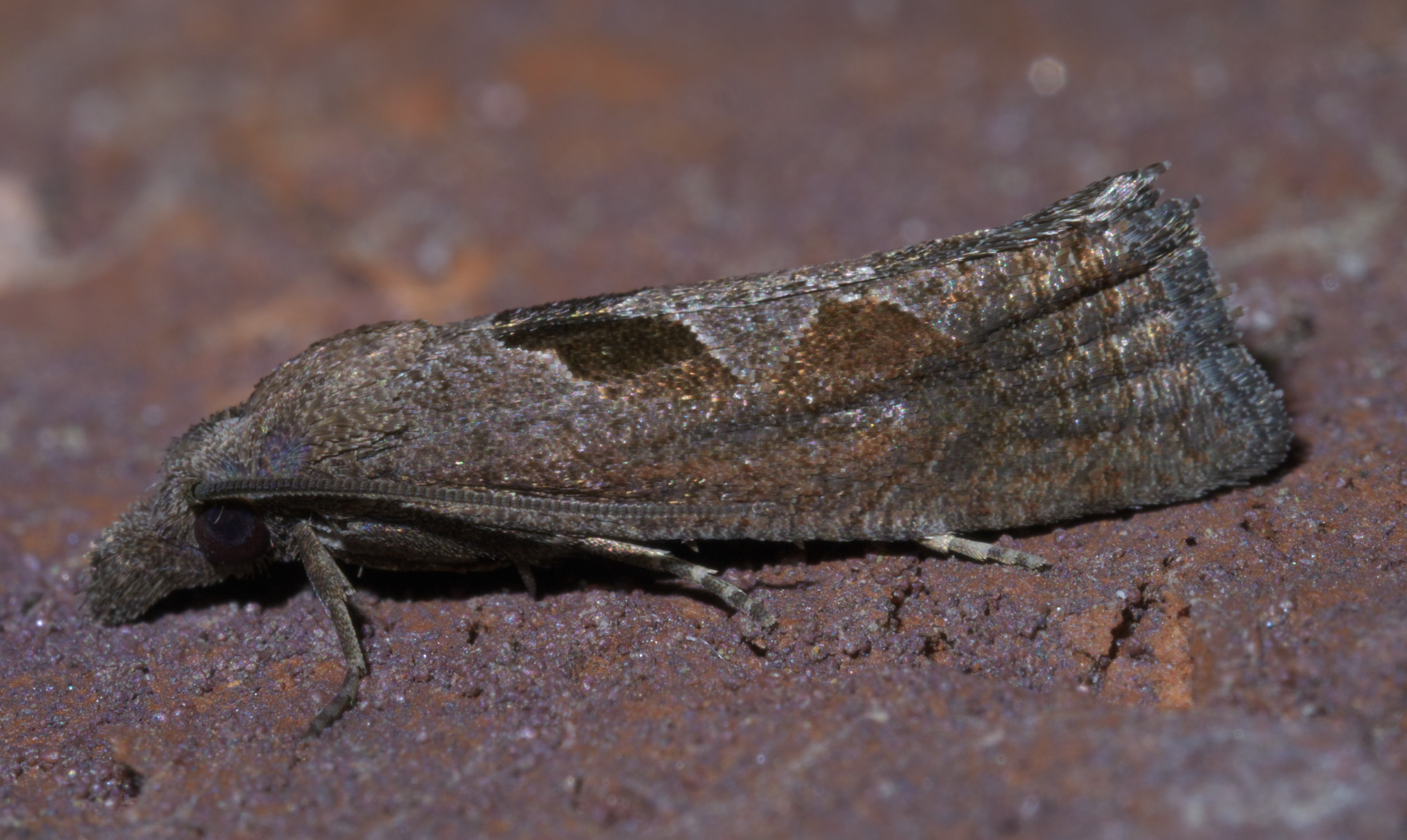
- Pelochrista similiana

Scientific classification
- Kingdom: Animalia
- Phylum: Arthropoda
- Clade: Pancrustacea
- Class: Insecta
- Order: Lepidoptera
- Family: Tortricidae
- Tribe: Eucosmini
- Genus: Pelochrista; Lederer, 1859

Synonyms
- Callimosema Clemens, 1865; Pseudeucosma Obraztsov, 1946; Eucosmoides Obraztsov, 1946

= Pelochrista =

Genus of tortrix moths

Pelochrista is a Holarctic genus of moths belonging to the subfamily Olethreutinae of the family Tortricidae.

== Species ==
- Pelochrista abstemia (Meyrick, 1932)
- Pelochrista adamantana (Guenée, 1845)
- Pelochrista agassizii (Robinson, 1869)
- Pelochrista agrestana (Treitschke, 1830)
- Pelochrista agricolana (Walsingham, 1879)
- Pelochrista ainsliei Wright, 2008
- Pelochrista albiguttana (Zeller, 1875)
- Pelochrista alphabetica (Walsingham, 1914)
- Pelochrista alpicola Kemal & Koçak, 2017
- Pelochrista angelana (Wright, 2012)
- Pelochrista apheliana (Kennel, 1901)
- Pelochrista arabescana (Eversmann, 1844)
- Pelochrista argenteana (Walsingham, 1895)
- Pelochrista argentialbana (Walsingham, 1879)
- Pelochrista argentifurcatana (Grote, 1876)
- Pelochrista arizonae Wright & Gilligan, 2017
- Pelochrista artesiana Wright & Gilligan, 2017
- Pelochrista atascosana (Blanchard, 1980)
- Pelochrista atomosana (Walsingham, 1879)
- Pelochrista aurantiaca Wright & Gilligan, 2017
- Pelochrista aureliana Popescu-Gorj, 1984
- Pelochrista aurilineana (Ferris, 2005)
- Pelochrista avalona (McDunnough, 1938)
- Pelochrista bactrana (Heinrich, 1923)
- Pelochrista biplagata (Walsingham, 1895)
- Pelochrista biquadrana (Walsingham, 1879)
- Pelochrista blanchardi (Wright, 2012)
- Pelochrista bleuseana (Oberthür, 1888)
- Pelochrista bolanderana (Walsingham, 1879)
- Pelochrista buddhana (Kennel, 1919)
- Pelochrista caecimaculana (Hübner, 1796-1799)
- Pelochrista caementana (Christoph, 1872)
- Pelochrista canana (Walsingham, 1879)
- Pelochrista canariana (Kearfott, 1907)
- Pelochrista candida (Wright, 2012)
- Pelochrista caniceps (Walsingham, 1884)
- Pelochrista cannatana (Trematerra, 2000)
- Pelochrista cataclystiana (Walker, 1863)
- Pelochrista chiricahuae Wright & Gilligan, 2017
- Pelochrista cinereolineana (Heinrich, 1923)
- Pelochrista coconana (Wright, 2011)
- Pelochrista collilonga Blanchard & Knudson, 1984
- Pelochrista comancheana Wright & Gilligan, 2017
- Pelochrista comatulana (Zeller, 1876)
- Pelochrista confidana (Chrétien, 1915)
- Pelochrista consobrinana (Heinrich, 1923)
- Pelochrista consociana (Heinrich, 1923)
- Pelochrista conspiciendana (Heinrich, 1923)
- Pelochrista corosana (Walsingham, 1884)
- Pelochrista costastriata (Wright, 2011)
- Pelochrista costastrigulana (Kearfott, 1907)
- Pelochrista crabtreei Wright, 2014
- Pelochrista crambitana (Walsingham, 1879)
- Pelochrista curlewensis (Wright, 2007)
- Pelochrista daemonicana (Heinrich, 1923)
- Pelochrista dagestana (Obraztsov, 1949)
- Pelochrista danilevskyi Kostyuk, 1975
- Pelochrista dapsilis (Heinrich, 1929)
- Pelochrista decolorana (Freyer, 1842)
- Pelochrista denverana (Kearfott, 1907)
- Pelochrista derelicta (Heinrich, 1929)
- Pelochrista diabolana (Blanchard, 1980)
- Pelochrista dilatana (Walsingham, 1895)
- Pelochrista dira Razowski, 1972
- Pelochrista disquei (Kennel, 1901)
- Pelochrista dodana (Kearfott, 1907)
- Pelochrista dorsisignatana (Clemens, 1860)
- Pelochrista duercki (Osthelder, 1941)
- Pelochrista eburata (Heinrich, 1929)
- Pelochrista edrisiana (Chrétien, 1922)
- Pelochrista elegantana (Kennel, 1901)
- Pelochrista emaciatana (Walsingham, 1884)
- Pelochrista erema Wright & Gilligan, 2017
- Pelochrista eversmanni (Kennel, 1901)
- Pelochrista exclusoriana (Heinrich, 1923)
- Pelochrista fandana (Kearfott, 1907)
- Pelochrista fernaldana (Grote, 1880)
- Pelochrista figurana Razowski, 1972
- Pelochrista fiskeana (Kearfott, 1905)
- Pelochrista flava Wright & Gilligan, 2017
- Pelochrista floridensis (Wright, 2011)
- Pelochrista fratruelis (Heinrich, 1923)
- Pelochrista fraudabilis (Heinrich, 1923)
- Pelochrista fremonti Wright & Gilligan, 2017
- Pelochrista fritillana (Blanchard & Knudson, 1982)
- Pelochrista frustata Razowski, 2006
- Pelochrista fulvostrigana (Constant, 1888)
- Pelochrista fuscosparsa (Walsingham, 1895)
- Pelochrista fuscostriata Wright, 2008
- Pelochrista fusculana (Zeller, 1847)
- Pelochrista galenapunctana (Kearfott, 1905)
- Pelochrista gelattana Wright, 2007
- Pelochrista gilletteana (Dyar, 1903)
- Pelochrista gilligani Wright, 2008
- Pelochrista graciliana (Kearfott, 1905)
- Pelochrista graduatana (Walsingham, 1879)
- Pelochrista grandiflavana (Walsingham, 1879)
- Pelochrista graziella (Blanchard, 1968)
- Pelochrista griselda (Blanchard & Knudson, 1982)
- Pelochrista griseolana (Zeller, 1847)
- Pelochrista guentheri (Tengström, 1869)
- Pelochrista guttulana (Blanchard, 1980)
- Pelochrista handana (Kearfott, 1907)
- Pelochrista hasseanthi (Clarke, 1952)
- Pelochrista hazelana (Klots, 1936)
- Pelochrista heathiana (Kearfott, 1907)
- Pelochrista heinrichi (McDunnough, 1925)
- Pelochrista hennei (Clarke, 1947)
- Pelochrista hepatariana (Herrich-Schäffer, 1851)
- Pelochrista hohana (Kearfott, 1907)
- Pelochrista huebneriana (Lienig & Zeller, 1846)
- Pelochrista hyponomeutana (Walsingham, 1895)
- Pelochrista idotatana (Kennel, 1901)
- Pelochrista immaculana (Kearfott, 1907)
- Pelochrista infidana (Hübner, 1823-1824)
- Pelochrista inquadrana (Walsingham, 1884)
- Pelochrista invicta (Walsingham, 1895)
- Pelochrista invisitana Kuznetzov, 1986
- Pelochrista irroratana (Walsingham, 1879)
- Pelochrista jodocana (Kennel, 1919)
- Pelochrista johnstoni (Wright, 2012)
- Pelochrista juncticiliana (Walsingham, 1879)
- Pelochrista kandana (Kearfott, 1907)
- Pelochrista kimballi Wright & Gilligan, 2017
- Pelochrista kingi Wright, 2008
- Pelochrista kuznetzovi Kostyuk, 1975
- Pelochrista labyrinthicana (Christoph, 1872)
- Pelochrista lafontainei (Wright, 2012)
- Pelochrista larana (Walsingham, 1879)
- Pelochrista latericiana (Rebel, 1919)
- Pelochrista lathami (Forbes, 1937)
- Pelochrista laticurva (Heinrich, 1929)
- Pelochrista latipalpana (Razowski, 1967)
- Pelochrista lineolana Kuznetzov, 1964
- Pelochrista lolana (Kearfott, 1907)
- Pelochrista louisana (McDunnough, 1944)
- Pelochrista lugubrana (Treitschke, 1830)
- Pelochrista luridana (Walsingham, 1879)
- Pelochrista lynxana Wright, 2015
- Pelochrista maculatana (Walsingham, 1879)
- Pelochrista maculiferana (Kennel, 1900)
- Pelochrista maculosa (Wright, 2012)
- Pelochrista mancipiana (Mann, 1855)
- Pelochrista matutina (Grote, 1873)
- Pelochrista mediostriata (Walsingham, 1895)
- Pelochrista medullana (Staudinger, 1880)
- Pelochrista mescalerana (Wright, 2012)
- Pelochrista metariana (Heinrich, 1923)
- Pelochrista metria Falkovitsh, 1964
- Pelochrista milleri Wright, 2007
- Pelochrista mirosignata (Heinrich, 1929)
- Pelochrista mobilensis (Heinrich, 1923)
- Pelochrista modicana (Zeller, 1847)
- Pelochrista mojaveana (Wright, 2011)
- Pelochrista mollitana (Zeller, 1847)
- Pelochrista momana (Kearfott, 1907)
- Pelochrista morrisoni (Walsingham, 1884)
- Pelochrista muhabbet Koçak, 2006
- Pelochrista murina Wright & Gilligan, 2017
- Pelochrista nandana (Kearfott, 1907)
- Pelochrista navajoensis (Wright, 2011)
- Pelochrista nordini (Wright, 2005)
- Pelochrista notialis (Miller, 1985)
- Pelochrista notocelioides Oku, 1972
- Pelochrista obscura Kuznetzov, 1978
- Pelochrista olivacea Wright & Gilligan, 2017
- Pelochrista opleri Wright & Gilligan, 2017
- Pelochrista optimana (Dyar, 1903)
- Pelochrista oraria (Wright, 2011)
- Pelochrista ornamentana (Rebel, 1916)
- Pelochrista ornata Kuznetzov, 1967
- Pelochrista palabundana (Heinrich, 1923)
- Pelochrista pallidipalpana (Kearfott, 1905)
- Pelochrista palpana (Walsingham, 1879)
- Pelochrista parapulveratana (Wright, 2011)
- Pelochrista passerana (Walsingham, 1879)
- Pelochrista persolita (Heinrich, 1929)
- Pelochrista pfisteri (Obraztsov, 1952)
- Pelochrista piperata (Wright, 2005)
- Pelochrista polingana Wright & Gilligan, 2017
- Pelochrista pollinaria Diakonoff, 1971
- Pelochrista popana (Kearfott, 1907)
- Pelochrista powelli Wright, 2005
- Pelochrista primulana (Walsingham, 1879)
- Pelochrista pulveratana (Walsingham, 1879)
- Pelochrista quinquemaculana (Robinson, 1869)
- Pelochrista ragonoti (Walsingham, 1895)
- Pelochrista reversana (Kearfott, 1907)
- Pelochrista richersana Wright, 2014
- Pelochrista ridingsana (Robinson, 1869)
- Pelochrista robinsonana (Grote, 1872)
- Pelochrista rorana (Kearfott, 1907)
- Pelochrista rosaocellana (Knudson, 1986)
- Pelochrista rufocostana (Wright, 2012)
- Pelochrista rufula Wright & Gilligan, 2017
- Pelochrista rushana (Obraztsov, 1943)
- Pelochrista russeola (Heinrich, 1929)
- Pelochrista salaciana (Blanchard & Knudson, 1982)
- Pelochrista sandiego (Kearfott, 1908)
- Pelochrista scintillana (Clemens, 1865)
- Pelochrista seamansi (Wright, 2011)
- Pelochrista sepiana (Wright, 2011)
- Pelochrista serapicana (Heinrich, 1923)
- Pelochrista serpentana (Walsingham, 1895)
- Pelochrista shastana (Walsingham, 1879)
- Pelochrista similiana (Clemens, 1860)
- Pelochrista snyderana (Kearfott, 1907)
- Pelochrista sordicomana (Staudinger, 1859)
- Pelochrista spaldingana (Kearfott, 1907)
- Pelochrista suadana (Heinrich, 1923)
- Pelochrista subflavana (Walsingham, 1879)
- Pelochrista subinvicta (Kearfott, 1907)
- Pelochrista subtiliana (Jäckh, 1960)
- Pelochrista succineana (Kennel, 1901)
- Pelochrista sullivani Wright, 2015
- Pelochrista symbolaspis (Meyrick, 1927)
- Pelochrista taosana (Wright, 2005)
- Pelochrista teleopa Razowski, 2006
- Pelochrista teleopea Razowski, 2006
- Pelochrista tholera Falkovitsh, 1964
- Pelochrista tibetana (Caradja, 1939)
- Pelochrista tolerans (Meyrick, 1930)
- Pelochrista tornimaculana (Zerny, 1935)
- Pelochrista totana (Kearfott, 1907)
- Pelochrista trematerrai Gaston, Vives & Revilla, 2017
- Pelochrista turiana (Zerny, 1927)
- Pelochrista umbraculana (Eversmann, 1844)
- Pelochrista vagana (McDunnough, 1925)
- Pelochrista vandana (Kearfott, 1907)
- Pelochrista wagneri Wright & Gilligan, 2017
- Pelochrista wandana (Kearfott, 1907)
- Pelochrista watertonana (McDunnough, 1925)
- Pelochrista womonana (Kearfott, 1907)
- Pelochrista wrighti Gilligan, Matthews & Miller, 2018
- Pelochrista zomonana (Kearfott, 1907)
- BOLD:AAB2898 (Pelochrista sp.)
- BOLD:AAB3376 (Pelochrista sp.)
- BOLD:AAC2220 (Pelochrista sp.)
- BOLD:AAD1760 (Pelochrista sp.)
- BOLD:AAE1001 (Pelochrista sp.)
- BOLD:AAE7175 (Pelochrista sp.)
- BOLD:AAF2066 (Pelochrista sp.)
- BOLD:AAF2067 (Pelochrista sp.)
- BOLD:AAF2308 (Pelochrista sp.)
- BOLD:AAI2373 (Pelochrista sp.)
- BOLD:AAY3260 (Pelochrista sp.)
- BOLD:ABX5598 (Pelochrista sp.)
- BOLD:ABY9135 (Pelochrista sp.)
- BOLD:ACE9831 (Pelochrista sp.)
- BOLD:ACF2004 (Pelochrista sp.)
- BOLD:ACI7803 (Pelochrista sp.)
- BOLD:ACL7666 (Pelochrista sp.)
- BOLD:ACX2942 (Pelochrista sp.)

== See also ==
- List of Tortricidae genera
