= Pelochrista huebneriana =

Scientific classification
- Kingdom: Animalia
- Phylum: Arthropoda
- Clade: Pancrustacea
- Class: Insecta
- Order: Lepidoptera
- Family: Tortricidae
- Genus: Pelochrista
- Species: P. huebneriana

Binomial name
- Pelochrista huebneriana (Lienig & Zeller, 1846)

Synonyms
- Paedisca huebneriana Lienig & Zeller, 1846

Species of moth

Pelochrista huebneriana is a species of moth of the family Tortricidae. It is found in China (Hebei, Shaanxi, Qinghai, Xinjiang), Russia, Kazakhstan and Europe, where it has been recorded from Denmark, Germany, Austria, the Czech Republic, Slovakia, Poland, Sweden, Finland, the Baltic region.

The wingspan is 17–22 mm. Adults have been recorded on wing from June to August.
