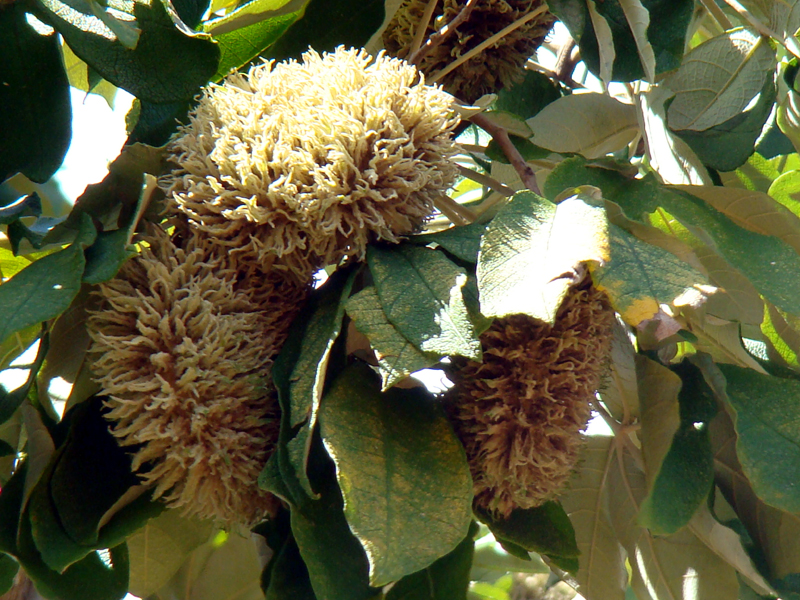

Conservation status
- Vulnerable (IUCN 2.3)

Scientific classification
- Kingdom: Plantae
- Clade: Tracheophytes
- Clade: Angiosperms
- Clade: Eudicots
- Clade: Asterids
- Order: Lamiales
- Family: Bignoniaceae
- Genus: Zeyheria
- Species: Z. tuberculosa

Binomial name
- Zeyheria tuberculosa Burman

Synonyms
- Bignonia tuberculosa Vell.; Jacaranda tuberculosa (Vell.) Steud.; Zeyheria kuntzei K.Schum.; Zeyheria tuberculosa (Vell.) Bureau

= Zeyheria tuberculosa =

Species of tree

Zeyheria tuberculosa is a species of tree in the family Bignoniaceae. It is endemic to Brazil, and is threatened by habitat loss.

== Description ==
These trees reach a height of 15 to 23 meters, with a trunk diameter of 40–60 cm. The leaves are compound, made of five leaflets, and grow to 40–60 cm in length. The tree blooms between November and January, and its fruit ripens between July and September. The seeds are light-weight and wind-borne.

== Uses ==
It is cited as a timber tree and is also used as an urban tree. The wood is flexible and durable. The tree is also used as an ornamental tree in landscaping. The fast growth and high reproduction rate allows this species to be used for the recovery of degraded areas. This has been shown to improve soil of previously deforested regions, adding nitrogen and potassium in the added organic matter.

Extracts from the tree, known as "ipê-preto", are used locally as medicine for cancer and skin-diseases. Laboratory tests have shown antimicrobial properties in these extracts, but due to concerns about toxicity no clinical applications have been utilized.
