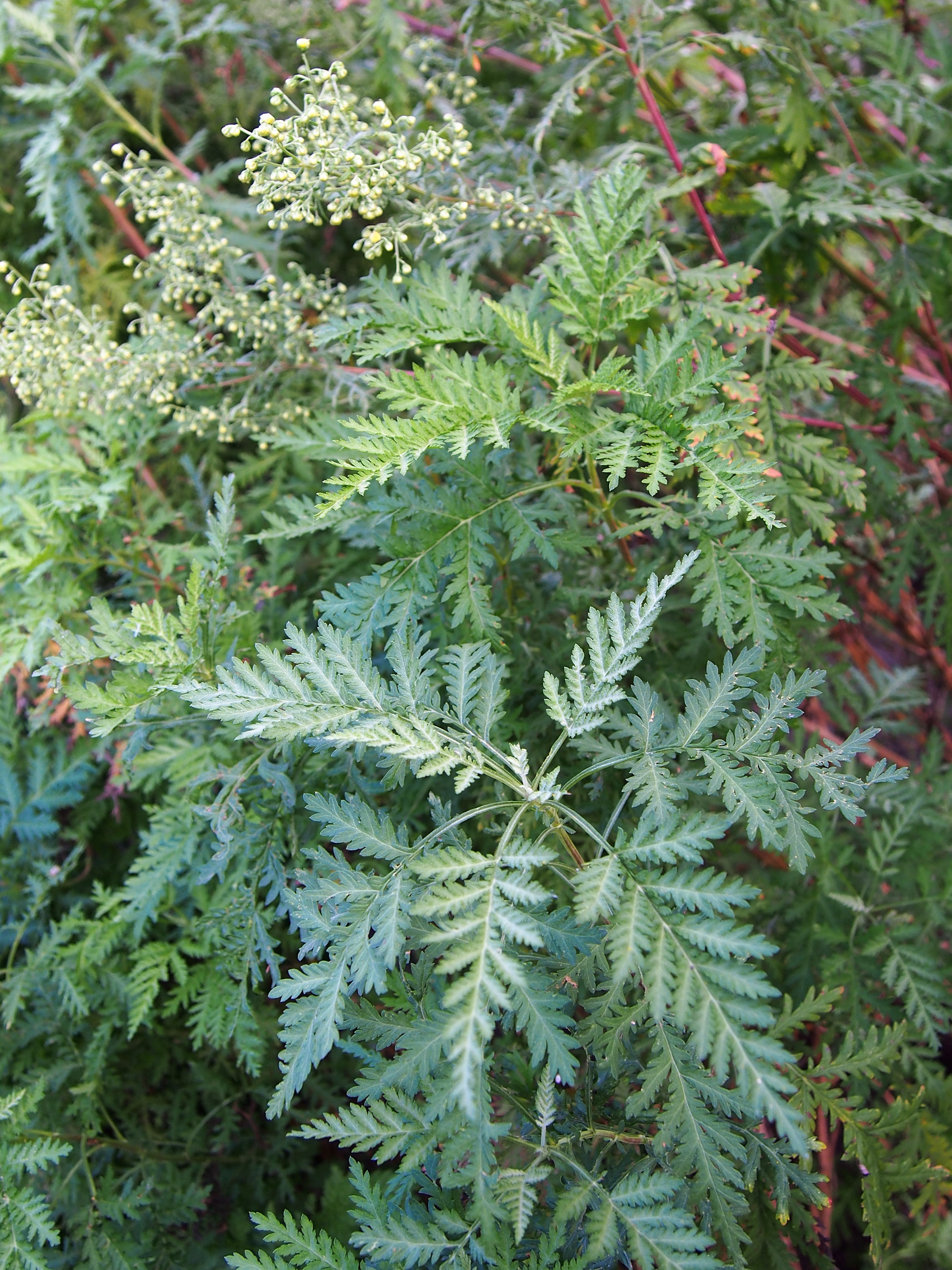

Scientific classification
- Kingdom: Plantae
- Clade: Tracheophytes
- Clade: Angiosperms
- Clade: Eudicots
- Clade: Asterids
- Order: Asterales
- Family: Asteraceae
- Genus: Artemisia
- Species: A. gmelinii

Binomial name
- Artemisia gmelinii Weber ex Stechm.

Varieties
- Artemisia gmelinii var. gmelinii; Artemisia gmelinii var. messerschmidiana (Besser) Poljakov

Synonyms
- Artemisia gmelinii var. legitima Besser

= Artemisia gmelinii =

Species of plant

Artemisia gmelinii, also known as Artemisia sacrorum, is a perennial shrub in the family Asteraceae. It is commonly known as Russian wormood or Gmelin's wormwood.

== Description ==
Artemisia gmelinii is a perennial shrub growing up to 150 cm (4.9 ft) tall. It has thick and mossy leaves which are elliptic and bi-pinnately dissected. Inflorescences are spherical and densely arranged.

== Distribution and habitat ==
It is native to China, Russia, Japan, and other parts of central Asia. It grows in a variety of habitats such as hills, meadows, roadsides, slopes and forest steppes.

== Uses ==
A. gmelinii contains veratric acid. In Korea, the leaf and stem are used to treat hepatitis, hyperlipaemia and infected cholecystitis. It contains flavonoids, sesquiterpenes and other bio-active constituents. This plant has 1% essential oil. Dried parts of the plant are used in traditional Chinese medicine.
