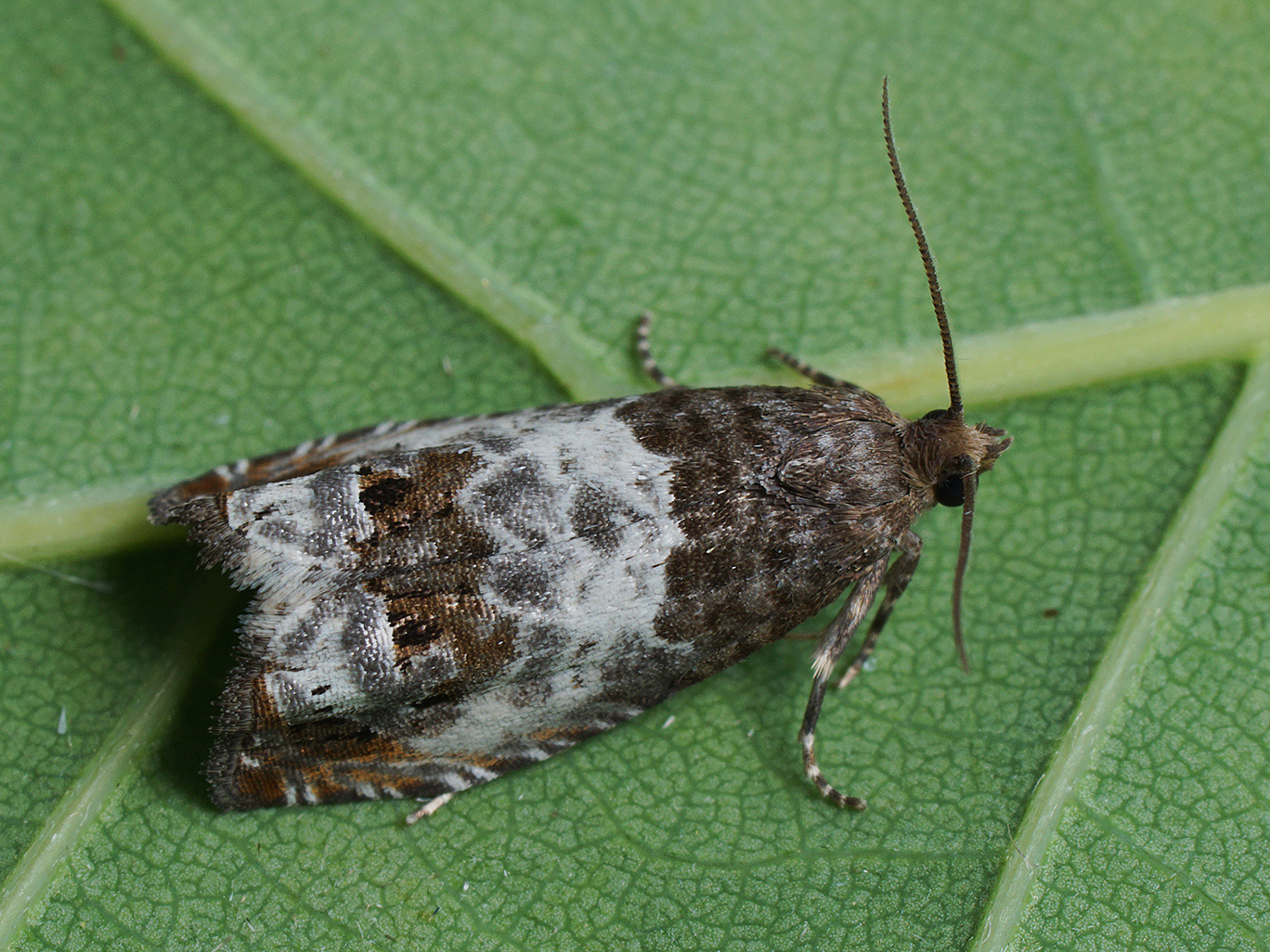

Scientific classification
- Kingdom: Animalia
- Phylum: Arthropoda
- Clade: Pancrustacea
- Class: Insecta
- Order: Lepidoptera
- Family: Tortricidae
- Genus: Notocelia
- Species: N. rosaecolana

Binomial name
- Notocelia rosaecolana (Doubleday, 1850)

Synonyms
- Spilonota rosaecolana Doubleday, 1850; Epiblema rosaecolana; Argyloploce rosae Matsumura, 1917; Grapholitha rosaecolona Ragonot, 1894; Grapholitha rosaeocolana Matsumura, 1931

= Notocelia rosaecolana =

Species of moth

Notocelia rosaecolana is a moth of the family Tortricidae. It is found in the Palearctic realm, where it has been recorded from China (Beijing, Hebei, Liaoning, Jilin, Heilongjiang, Fujian, Jiangxi, Henan, Hubei, Hunan, Sichuan, Guizhou, Shaanxi, and Gansu), Mongolia, Korea, Japan, Iran, Central Asia, Russia and Europe.

The wingspan is 15–20 mm. The moth closely resembles Notocelia trimaculana and Notocelia roborana. The forewings are dilated, the costa is moderately and evenly arched and the fold does not reach the middle. The ground colour is white. The costa is strigulated with dark fuscous. The basal patch is dark fuscous, its edge rather rounded, followed by some grey marks towards costa and dorsum. The lower half of the central fascia is fuscous spotted with black, preceded by a grey mark. The ocellus is edged with leaden-metallic, enclosing three or four black dots. There are some brown or ferruginous and leaden-metallic streaks towards the apex. The hindwings are light grey. The larva is purplish-brown, beneath whitish; head brown; plate of 2 black :

Adults are on wing from late May to August in western Europe.

The larvae feed on various roses, including Rosa multiflora, Rosa davurica and Rosa rugosa.
