= Rosa gmelinii =

Rosa gmelinii can refer to the following plant species:

- Rosa gmelinii Bunge, a synonym of Rosa acicularis Lindl. subsp. acicularis
- Rosa gmelinii Ledeb., a synonym of Rosa davurica Pall. var. davurica
