= Notocelia trimaculana =

Scientific classification
- Kingdom: Animalia
- Phylum: Arthropoda
- Clade: Pancrustacea
- Class: Insecta
- Order: Lepidoptera
- Family: Tortricidae
- Genus: Notocelia
- Species: N. trimaculana

Binomial name
- Notocelia trimaculana Haworth, 1811

Synonyms
- Tortrix trimaculana Haworth, [1811]; Aspidia suffusana Duponchel, in Godart, 1842

Species of moth

Notocelia trimaculana is a moth of the family Tortricidae. It is found in the Palearctic realm.

The wingspan is 15–18 mm. It differs from Notocelia rosaecolana as follows : forewings somewhat narrower, costa less arched, fold reaching middle, ground-colour much mixed and marked with grey except on a quadrate dorsal spot beyond basal patch; hindwings grey. The larva is reddish-brown, sometimes tinged with greenish; head light brown; plate of 2 black : on hawthorn.

The moth flies from June to July depending on the location.

The larvae feed on Crataegus, Prunus spinosa and Pyrus .
