= Notocelia nigripunctata =

Scientific classification
- Domain: Eukaryota
- Kingdom: Animalia
- Phylum: Arthropoda
- Class: Insecta
- Order: Lepidoptera
- Family: Tortricidae
- Genus: Notocelia
- Species: N. nigripunctata

Binomial name
- Notocelia nigripunctata Kuznetsov, 1973

Species of moth

Notocelia nigripunctata is a species of moth of the family Tortricidae. It is found in Shaanxi, China.
