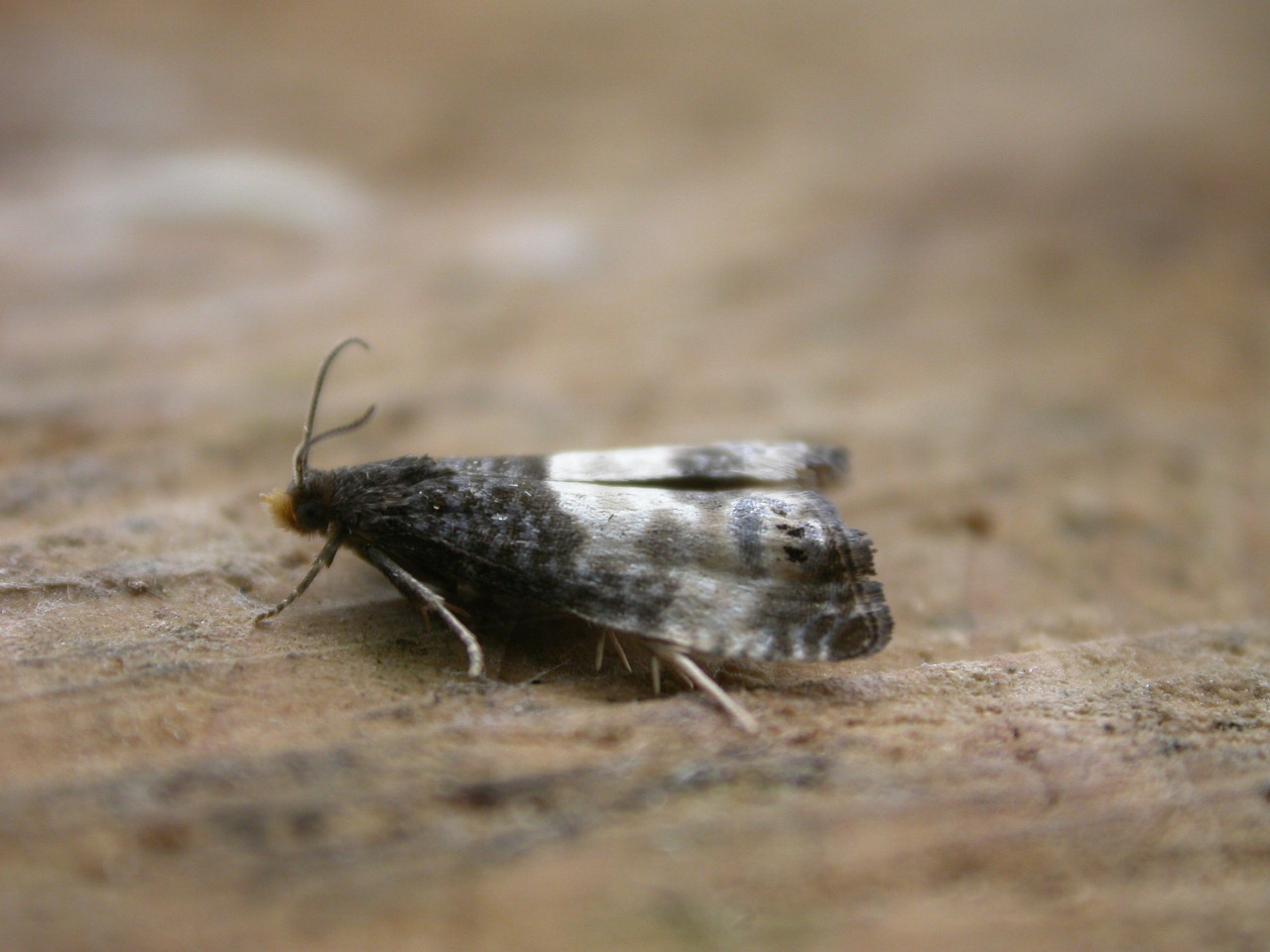

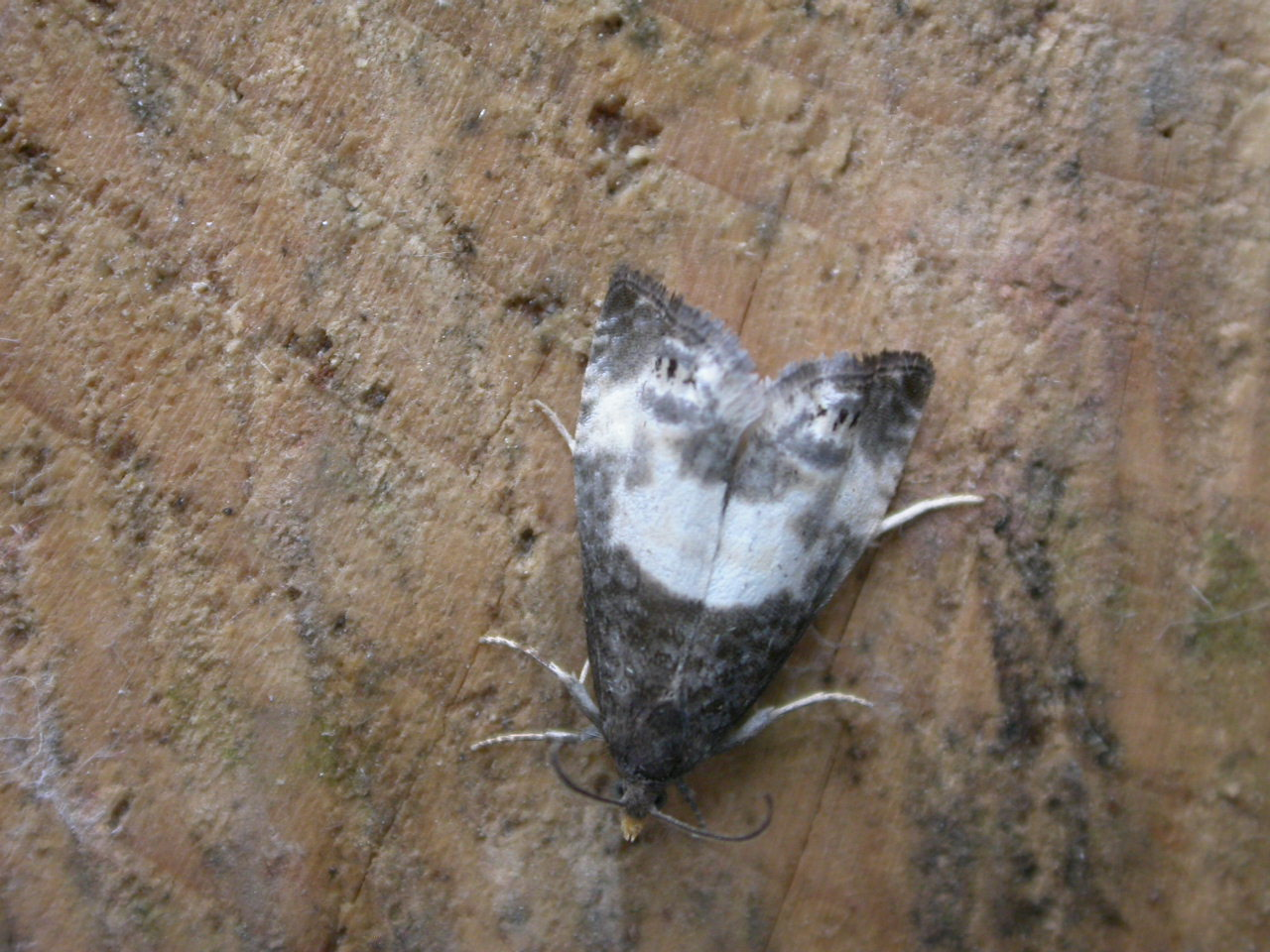

Scientific classification
- Kingdom: Animalia
- Phylum: Arthropoda
- Class: Insecta
- Order: Lepidoptera
- Family: Tortricidae
- Genus: Notocelia
- Species: N. cynosbatella

Binomial name
- Notocelia cynosbatella (Linnaeus, 1758)

Synonyms
- Phalaena cynosbatella Linnaeus, 1758; Pyralis cynosbana Fabricius, 1775; Phalaena cynosbatelta Linnaeus, 1761; Tortrix tripunctana [Denis & Schiffermuller], 1775; Epiblema tripunctata Palm, 1947

= Notocelia cynosbatella =

Species of moth

Notocelia cynosbatella is a moth of the family Tortricidae. It is found from Europe to eastern Russia, it is also found in Asia Minor, Iran, Kazakhstan, China and Mongolia.

The wingspan is 16–22 mm.

Adults are on wing in May and June.
