= Notocelia autolitha =

Scientific classification
- Kingdom: Animalia
- Phylum: Arthropoda
- Class: Insecta
- Order: Lepidoptera
- Family: Tortricidae
- Genus: Notocelia
- Species: N. autolitha

Binomial name
- Notocelia autolitha (Meyrick, 1931)

Synonyms
- Eucosma autolitha Meyrick, 1931; Epiblema autolitha

Species of moth

Notocelia autolitha is a species of moth of the family Tortricidae. It is found in China (Tianjin, Hebei, Jilin, Heilongjiang, Zhejiang, Henan, Hubei, Hunan, Anhui, Fujian, Guangdong, Sichuan, Guizhou, Shaanxi, Gansu), Korea and Japan.

The wingspan is 13.5–17 mm.

The larvae feed on Tachilus thunbergii.
