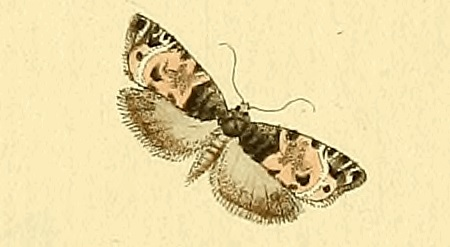

Scientific classification
- Kingdom: Animalia
- Phylum: Arthropoda
- Clade: Pancrustacea
- Class: Insecta
- Order: Lepidoptera
- Family: Tortricidae
- Genus: Notocelia
- Species: N. incarnatana

Binomial name
- Notocelia incarnatana (Hübner, [1796-1799])

Synonyms
- Tortrix incarnatana Hübner, [1796-1799]; Epiblema incarnatana; Tortrix amoenana Hubner, [1814-1817]; Tortrix incarnana Haworth, [1811]; Notocelia longispina Nasu, 1980

= Notocelia incarnatana =

Species of moth

Notocelia incarnatana, the chalk rose bell, is a species of moth of the family Tortricidae. It is found in China, Mongolia, Japan, Russia, Kazakhstan and Europe, where it has been recorded from most of the continent, except parts of the Balkan Peninsula.

The wingspan is 14–20 mm. The forewings have a slightly arched costa, the fold reaching middle. The ground colour is rosy whitish, sometimes ochreous-tinged, sometimes striated with fuscous. The costa is strigulated with dark fuscous. The basal patch is fuscous or ferruginous-brown, black-marked, its edge nearly straight. The central fascia is ill-defined, grey or ferruginous, with a black posterior subdorsal projection . The apical area is streaked with ferruginous and leaden-metallic, marked with black. The hindwings are whitish fuscous. The larva is reddish-brown; head light brown; plate of 2 black

Adults are on wing from June to early September in western Europe.

The larvae feed on Rosa canina and Rosa rugosa. They live in the spun leaves of their host plant. Larvae can be found from May to June. Pupation takes place within the spun leaves.
