= Notocelia kurosawai =

Scientific classification
- Kingdom: Animalia
- Phylum: Arthropoda
- Class: Insecta
- Order: Lepidoptera
- Family: Tortricidae
- Genus: Notocelia
- Species: N. kurosawai

Binomial name
- Notocelia kurosawai Kawabe, 1986

Species of moth

Notocelia kurosawai is a species of moth of the family Tortricidae. It is found in Taiwan.
