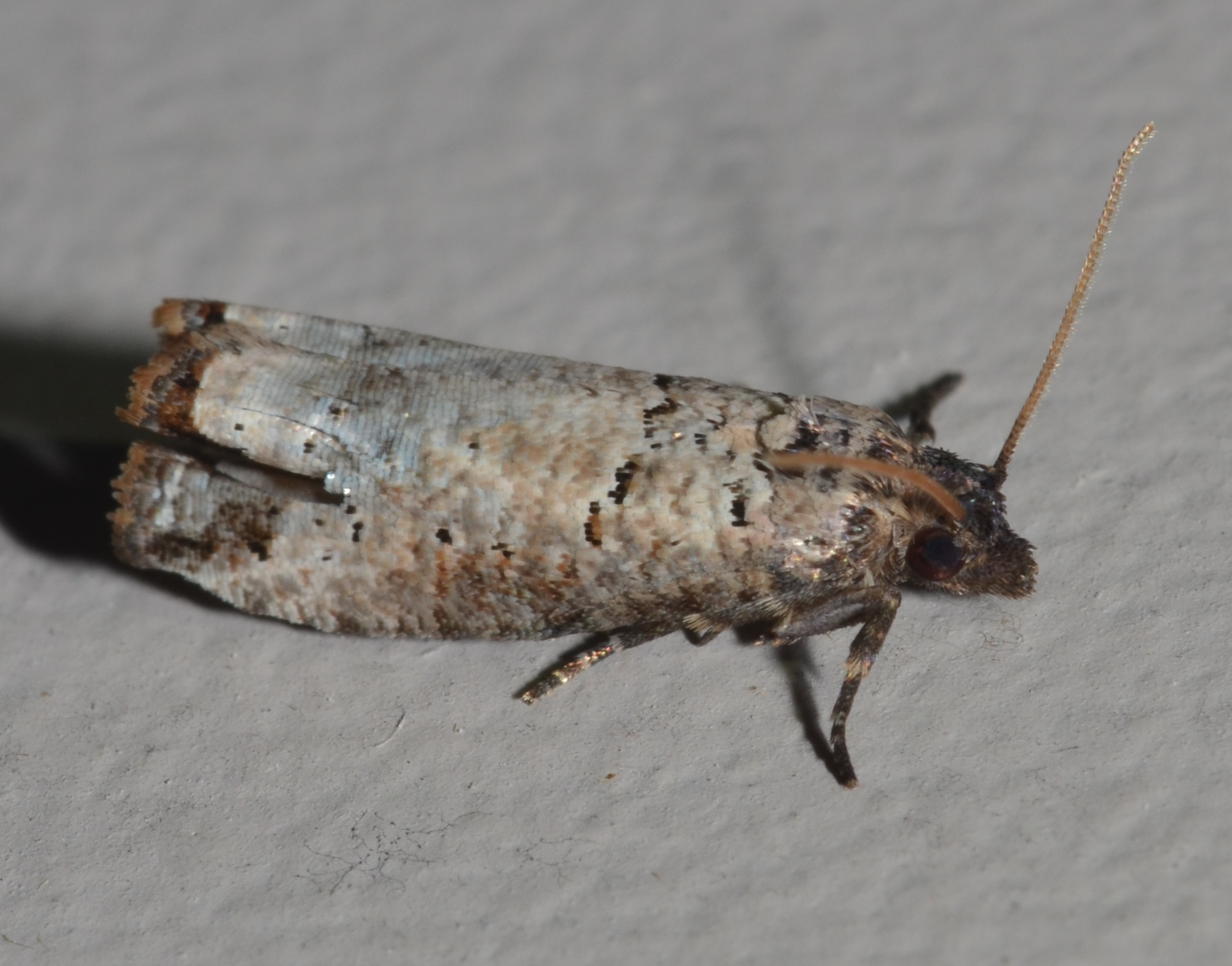

Scientific classification
- Domain: Eukaryota
- Kingdom: Animalia
- Phylum: Arthropoda
- Class: Insecta
- Order: Lepidoptera
- Family: Tortricidae
- Genus: Notocelia
- Species: N. culminana

Binomial name
- Notocelia culminana (Walsingham, 1879)

= Notocelia culminana =

Species of moth

Notocelia culminana is a species of tortricid moth in the family Tortricidae.

The MONA or Hodges number for Notocelia culminana is 3211.

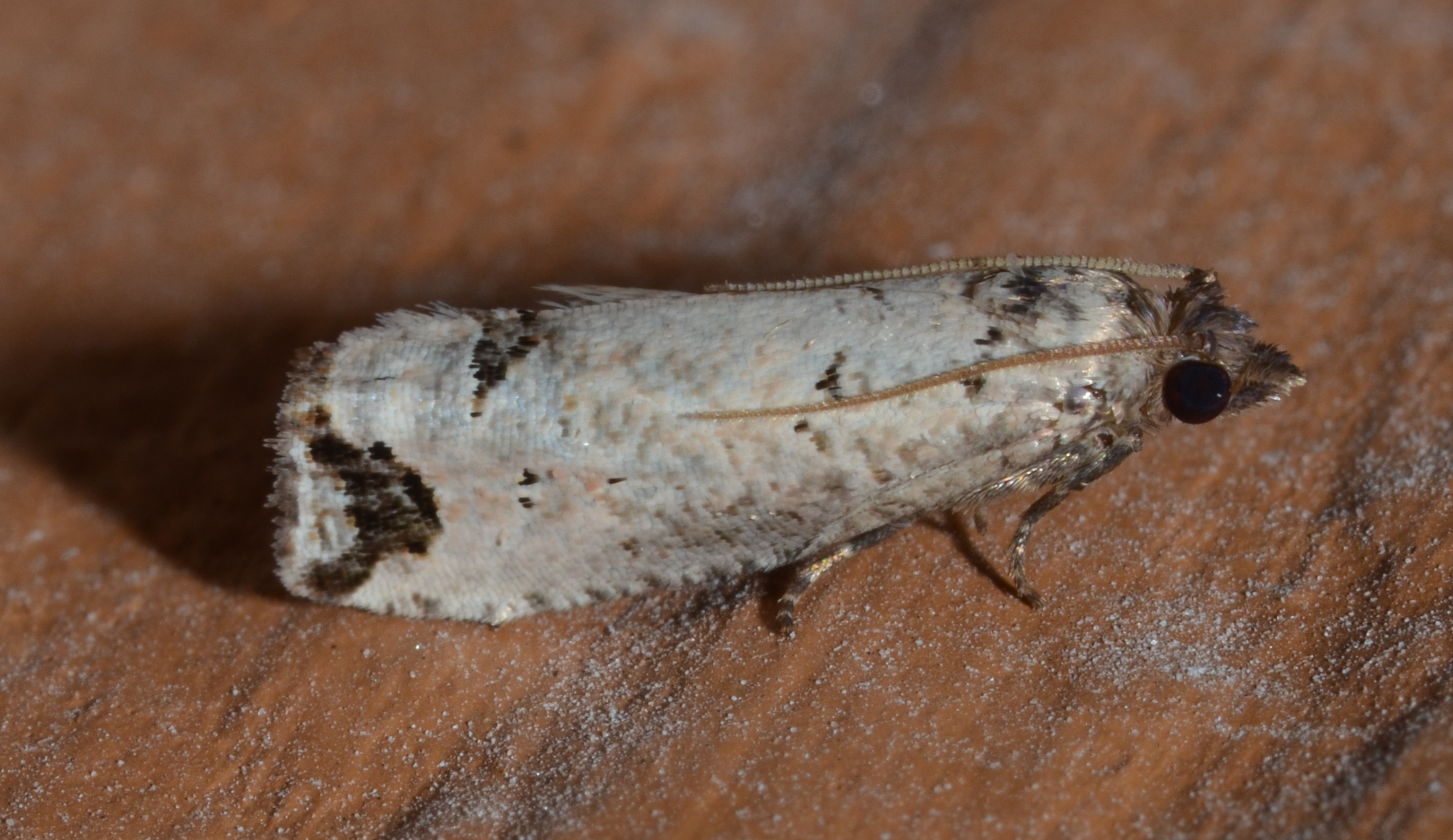
