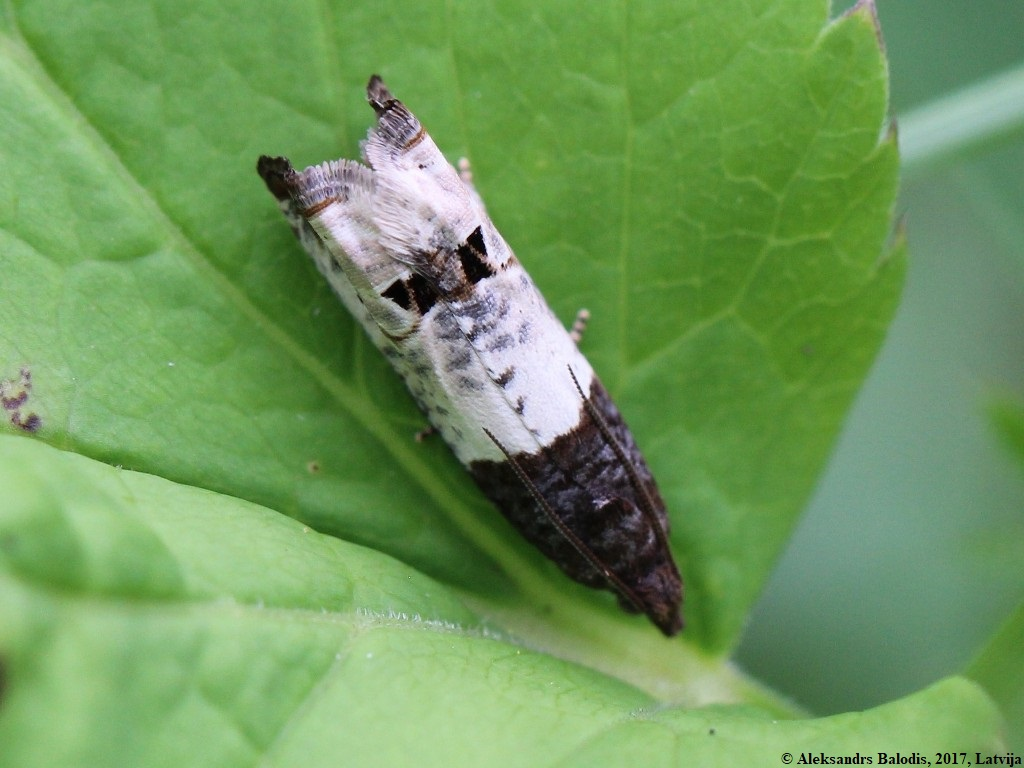
- Notocelia roborana

Scientific classification
- Kingdom: Animalia
- Phylum: Arthropoda
- Clade: Pancrustacea
- Class: Insecta
- Order: Lepidoptera
- Family: Tortricidae
- Tribe: Eucosmini
- Genus: Notocelia; Hübner, [1825]

= Notocelia =

Genus of tortrix moths

Notocelia is a genus of moths belonging to the subfamily Olethreutinae of the family Tortricidae.

== Species ==
- Notocelia albosectana (Mabille, 1900)
- Notocelia aritai Kawabe, 1989
- Notocelia autolitha (Meyrick, 1931)
- Notocelia culminana (Walsingham, 1879)
- Notocelia cycloides Diakonoff, 1989
- Notocelia cynosbatella (Linnaeus, 1758)
- Notocelia donaldana Kawabe, 1993
- Notocelia illotana (Walsingham, 1879)
- Notocelia incarnatana (Hübner, [1796-1799])
- Notocelia kurosawai Kawabe, 1986
- Notocelia mediterranea (Obratzsov, 1952)
- Notocelia nigripunctata Kuznetzov, 1973
- Notocelia nimia Falkovitsh, 1965
- Notocelia nobilis Kuznetzov, 1973
- Notocelia plumbea Nasu, 1980
- Notocelia punicana Kuznetzov, 1956
- Notocelia roborana (Denis & Schiffermuller, 1775)
- Notocelia purpurissatana (Heinrich, 1923)
- Notocelia rosaecolana (Doubleday, 1850)
- Notocelia scotodes Bradley, 1965
- Notocelia tetragonana (Stephens, 1834)
- Notocelia trimaculana (Haworth, [1811])
- Notocelia uddmanniana (Linnaeus, 1758)
- Notocelia yakushimensis Kawabe, 1974
- Notocelia zelota (Meyrick, 1916)

== See also ==
- List of Tortricidae genera
