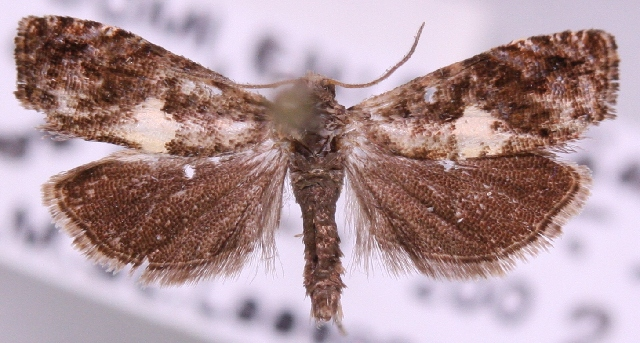

Scientific classification
- Domain: Eukaryota
- Kingdom: Animalia
- Phylum: Arthropoda
- Class: Insecta
- Order: Lepidoptera
- Family: Tortricidae
- Genus: Notocelia
- Species: N. tetragonana

Binomial name
- Notocelia tetragonana (Stephens, 1834)

Synonyms
- Spilonota Epinotia tetragonana Stephens, 1834; Epiblema tetragonana; Spilonota (Epinotia) tetragonana Stephens, 1829

= Notocelia tetragonana =

Species of moth

Notocelia tetragonana, the square-spot bell, is a species of moth of the family Tortricidae. It is found in China (Beijing, Jilin, Heilongjiang), Russia and Europe, where it has been recorded from most of the continent, except the Iberian Peninsula, the Netherlands, Denmark and most of the Balkan Peninsula. The habitat consists of woodland and scrubland.

The wingspan is 13–18 mm. The forewings are brown black with darker black clouds. There is a white blotch on the inner margin. The hindwings are black. Adults are on wing from June to July in western Europe.

The larvae feed on Rosa species. They spin the leaves of their host plant. Larvae can be found from May to June.
