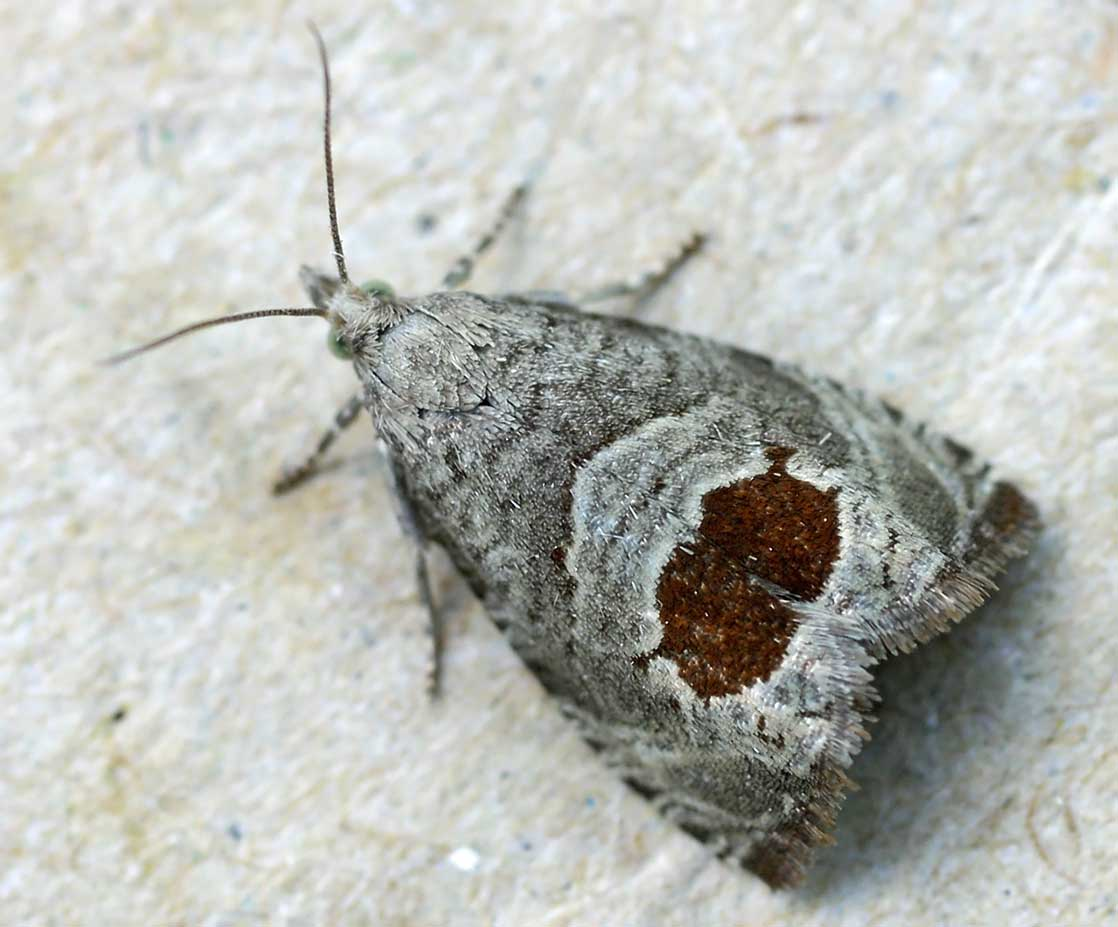

Scientific classification
- Kingdom: Animalia
- Phylum: Arthropoda
- Class: Insecta
- Order: Lepidoptera
- Family: Tortricidae
- Genus: Notocelia
- Species: N. uddmanniana

Binomial name
- Notocelia uddmanniana (Linnaeus, 1758)

Synonyms
- Phalaena uddmanniana Linnaeus, 1758; Tortrix achatana Hubner, [1796-1799]; Notocelia orientana Caradja, 1916; Phalaena rubiana Scopoli, 1763; Tortrix udmanniana [Denis & Schiffermuller], 1775

= Notocelia uddmanniana =

Species of moth

Notocelia uddmanniana, the bramble shoot moth, is a moth of the family Tortricidae. It is found in Western Europe and the area surrounding the Mediterranean Sea all the way up to the Caucasus, Kazakhstan, Iran and China (Guizhou, Tibet).

The wingspan is 15–20 mm. The forewings are dilated and the costa is moderately arched. The ground colour is whitish -brownish, striated with fuscous. The costa is posteriorly dark fuscous strigulated with whitish.. The angulated edge of basal patch is darker. The central fascia is fuscous, anteriorly indistinct, ending in a large rounded-triangular dark reddish-fuscous whitish-edged dorsal spot. There is an oblique fuscous fascia before the apex, hardly reaching the costa. The extreme apex is dark reddish-fuscous. The hindwings are grey. The larva is dull reddish-brown; head and plate of 2 black.

The moth flies from late June to late July in western Europe.

The larvae feed on various Rubus species.
