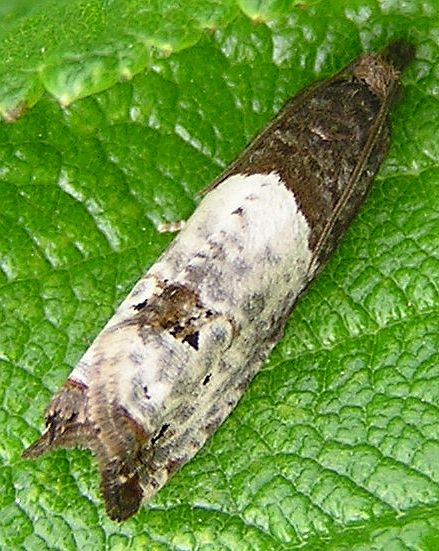

Scientific classification
- Kingdom: Animalia
- Phylum: Arthropoda
- Class: Insecta
- Order: Lepidoptera
- Family: Tortricidae
- Genus: Notocelia
- Species: N. roborana

Binomial name
- Notocelia roborana (Denis & Schiffermüller, 1775)

Synonyms
- Tortrix roborana Denis & Schiffermüller, 1775; Epiblema aquana (Hübner, [1796-1799]); Notocelia aquana (Hübner, [1796-1799]); Tortrix aquana Hübner, [1796-1799]

= Notocelia roborana =

Species of moth

Notocelia roborana is a moth of the family Tortricidae. It is found from Europe to eastern Russia. It is also found in Asia Minor, Iran, Mongolia and China (Xinjiang).

The wingspan is 16–22 mm.
