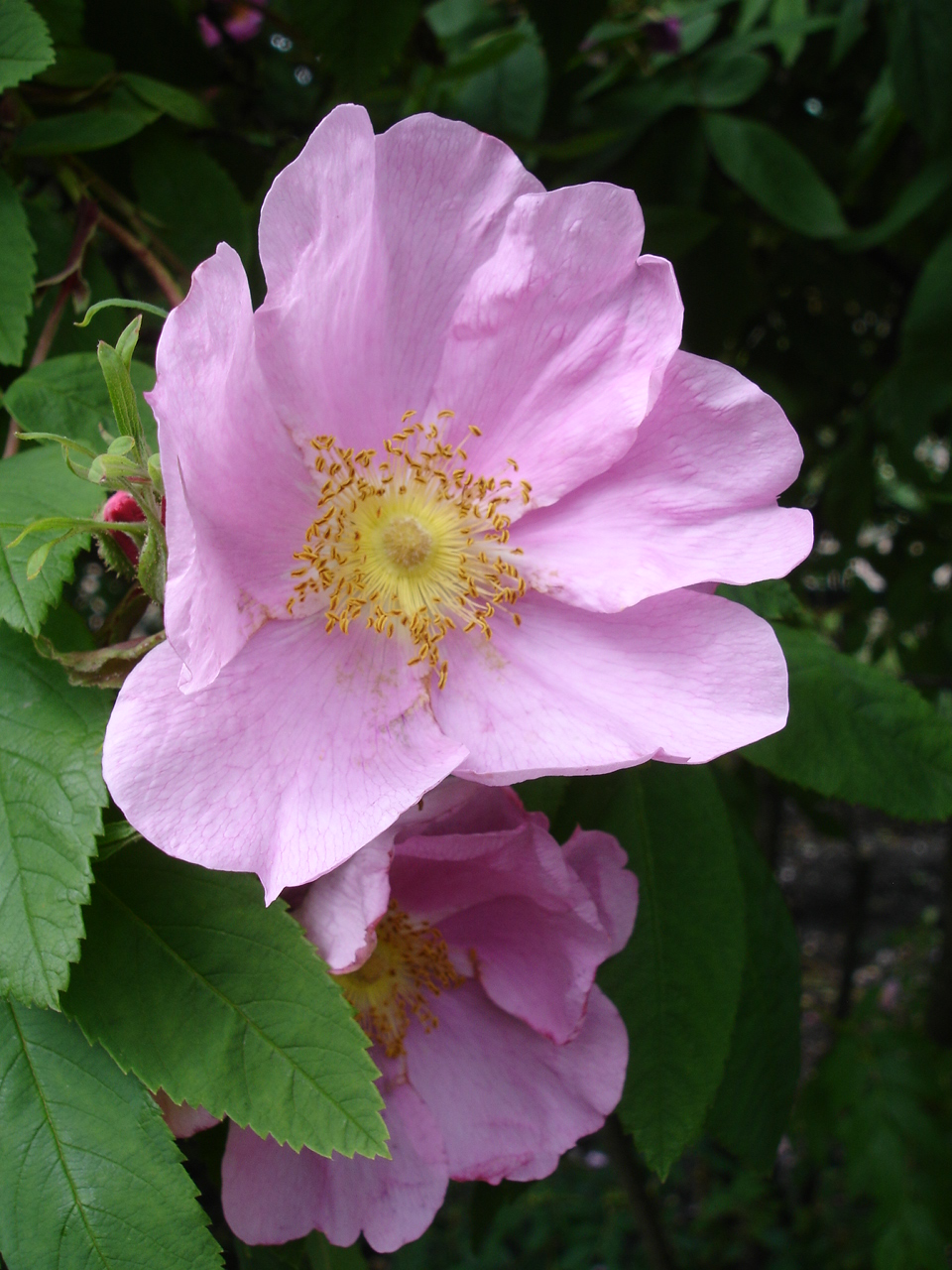
- Close-up of flower
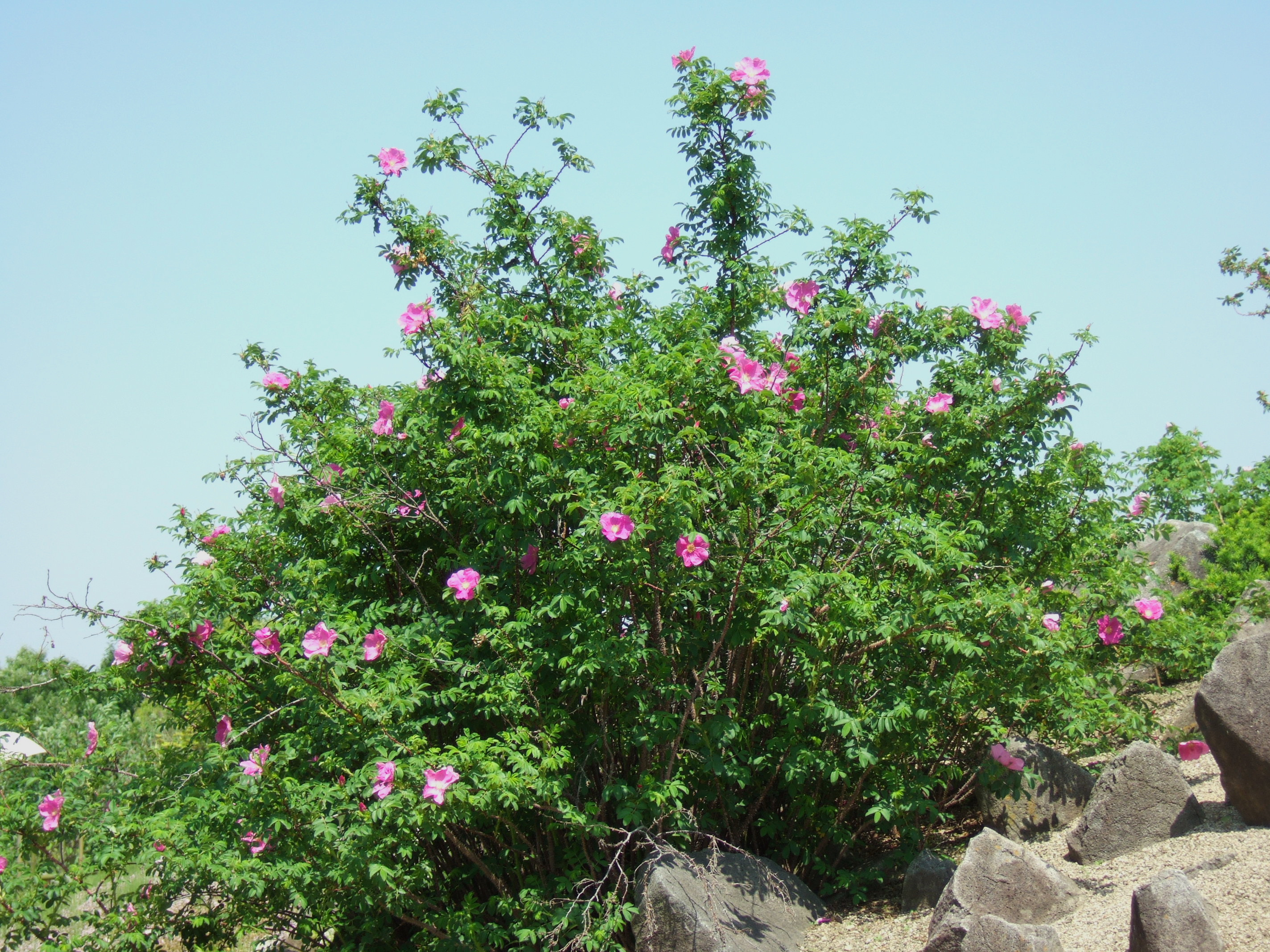
- Habit

Scientific classification
- Kingdom: Plantae
- Clade: Embryophytes
- Clade: Tracheophytes
- Clade: Spermatophytes
- Clade: Angiosperms
- Clade: Eudicots
- Clade: Rosids
- Order: Rosales
- Family: Rosaceae
- Genus: Rosa
- Species: R. davurica

Binomial name
- Rosa davurica Pall.

Synonyms
- List: Rosa amblyotis subsp. jacutica (Juz.) Vorosch.; Rosa cinnamomea var. dahurica C.A.Mey.; Rosa cinnamomea var. davurica (Pall.) Rupr.; Rosa dahurica Pall.; Rosa davurica f. alba (Nakai) T.B.Lee; Rosa davurica var. alba Nakai; Rosa davurica f. ellipsoidea (Nakai) M.Kim; Rosa davurica var. ellipsoidea Nakai; Rosa davurica var. ellipsoides Nakai ex T.H.Chung; Rosa davurica var. glabra Liou; Rosa davurica f. marrettii (H.Lév.) Sugim.; Rosa davurica f. oblongocarpa Skvortsov; Rosa davurica f. pubescens Liou; Rosa davurica f. rotundocarpa Skvortsov; Rosa davurica var. rubrostipulata (Nakai) D.C.Son & Young S.Kim; Rosa davurica var. setacea Liou; Rosa gmelinii Ledeb.; Rosa jacutica Juz.; Rosa marretii H.Lév.; Rosa marretii var. alpestris (Nakai) Uyeki; Rosa rubiginosa var. willdenoviana (Spreng.) Regel; Rosa rubrostipullata Nakai; Rosa rubrostipullata var. alpestris Nakai; Rosa willdenowii Spreng.

= Rosa davurica =

Species of plant

Rosa davurica, the Amur rose, is a species of flowering plant in the family Rosaceae. It is native to eastern Siberia, the Russian Far East, Mongolia, northern China, Korea, and Japan. An erect shrub reaching 1.5 m (5 ft), it is typically found on hills and slopes, preferring sunny situations such as forest edges and grasslands at elevations from 400 to 2,500 m (1,300 to 8,200 ft).

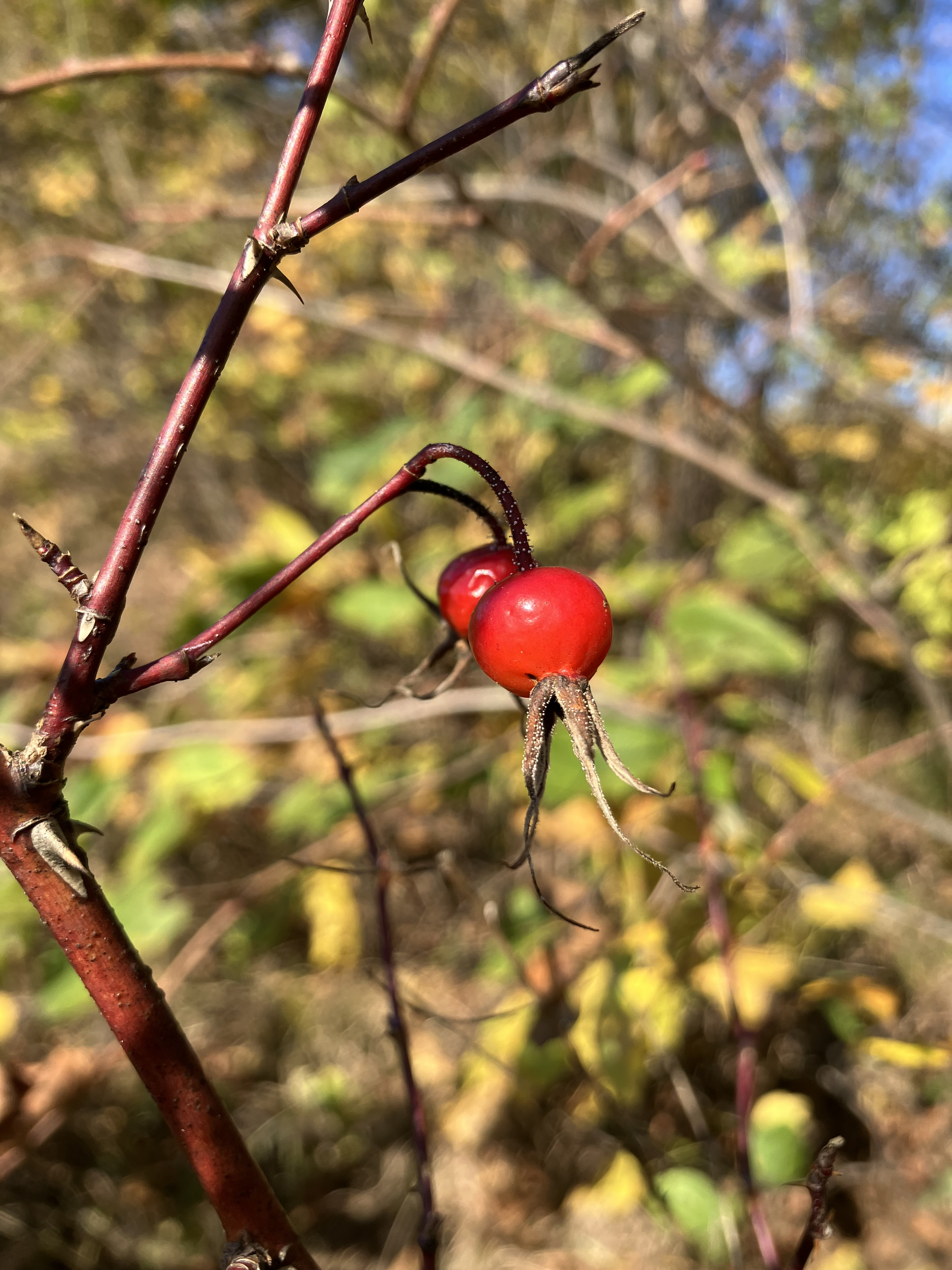
Hips

== Subtaxa ==
The following varieties are accepted:

- Rosa davurica var. alpestris (Nakai) Kitag. – Korea, Sakhalin, Japan
- Rosa davurica var. davurica – Eastern Siberia, Russian Far East, Mongolia, northern China, Korea, introduced to Poland
