= Sycacantha pararufata =

Scientific classification
- Domain: Eukaryota
- Kingdom: Animalia
- Phylum: Arthropoda
- Class: Insecta
- Order: Lepidoptera
- Family: Tortricidae
- Genus: Sycacantha
- Species: S. pararufata

Binomial name
- Sycacantha pararufata Razowski, 2009

Species of moth

Sycacantha pararufata is a moth of the family Tortricidae. It is found in Vietnam.

The wingspan is about 24.5 mm.

== Etymology ==
The name refers to similarity with Phaecasiophora rufata.
