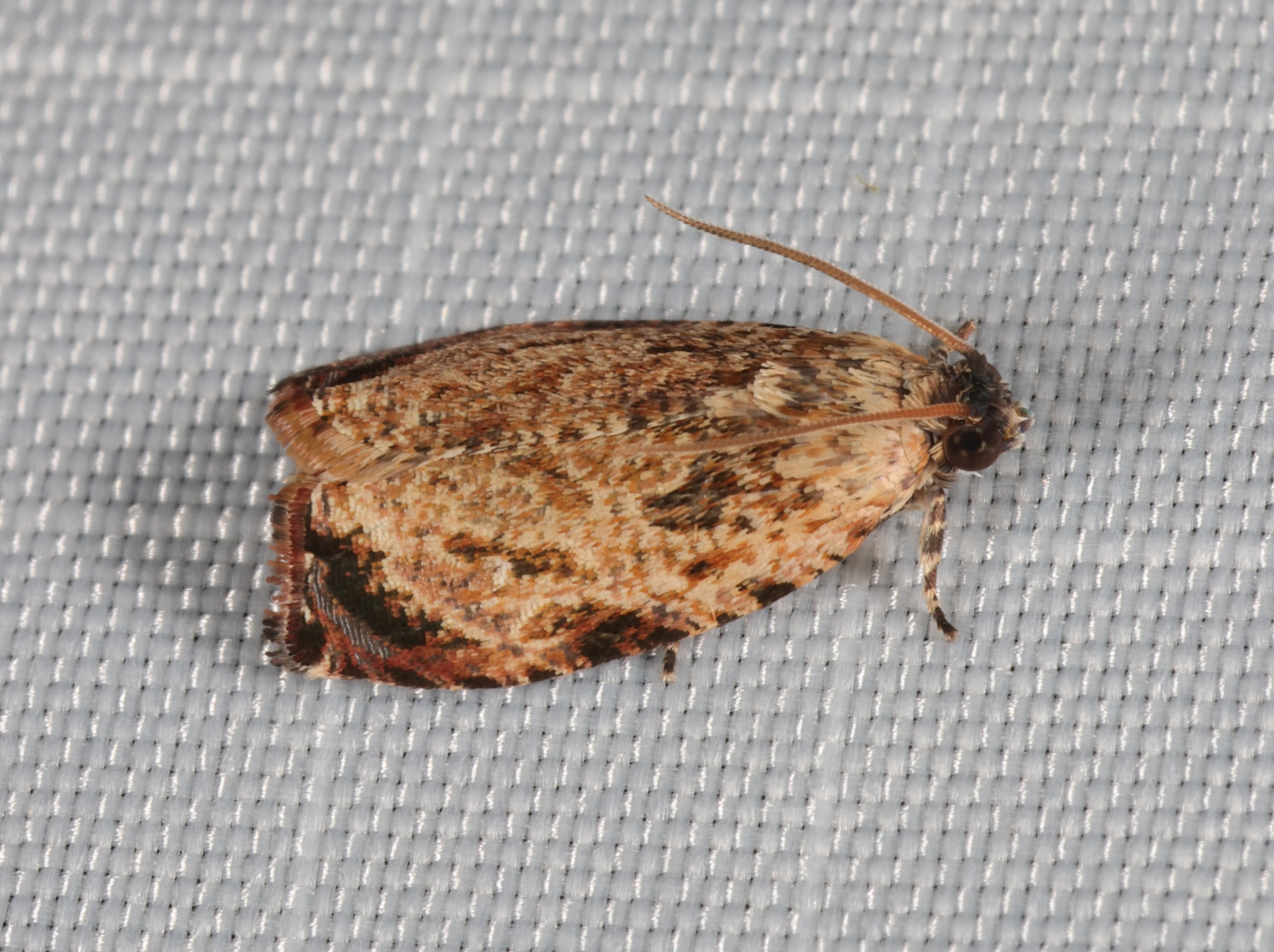
- Sycacantha inopinata

Scientific classification
- Kingdom: Animalia
- Phylum: Arthropoda
- Clade: Pancrustacea
- Class: Insecta
- Order: Lepidoptera
- Family: Tortricidae
- Subfamily: Olethreutinae
- Tribe: Olethreutini
- Genus: Sycacantha; Diakonoff, 1959

= Sycacantha =

Genus of tortrix moths

Sycacantha is a genus of moths belonging to the subfamily Olethreutinae of the family Tortricidae.

== Species ==
- Sycacantha amphimorpha Diakonoff, 1973
- Sycacantha atactodes (Turner, 1946)
- Sycacantha beatana Kuznetzov, 2003
- Sycacantha caryozona Diakonoff, 1973
- Sycacantha castanicolor (Turner, 1946)
- Sycacantha catharia Diakonoff, 1973
- Sycacantha choanantha Diakonoff, 1971
- Sycacantha cinerascens Diakonoff, 1973
- Sycacantha complicitana (Walker, 1863)
- Sycacantha concentra Diakonoff, 1973
- Sycacantha crocamicta Diakonoff, 1973
- Sycacantha diakonoffi Kawabe, 1987
- Sycacantha diatoma Diakonoff, 1966
- Sycacantha dissita Diakonoff, 1973
- Sycacantha escharota (Meyrick, 1910)
- Sycacantha exedra (Turner, 1916)
- Sycacantha formosa Diakonoff, 1971
- Sycacantha hilarograpta (Meyrick, 1933)
- Sycacantha homichlodes Diakonoff, 1973
- Sycacantha incondita Diakonoff, 1973
- Sycacantha inopinata Diakonoff, 1973
- Sycacantha maior Diakonoff, 1973
- Sycacantha montana Razowski, 2009
- Sycacantha nereidopa (Meyrick, 1927)
- Sycacantha ngoclinhana Razowski, 2009
- Sycacantha niphostetha (Turner, 1946)
- Sycacantha obtundana Kuznetzov, 1988
- Sycacantha occulta Diakonoff, 1973
- Sycacantha orphnogenes (Meyrick, 1939)
- Sycacantha ostracachtys Diakonoff, 1973
- Sycacantha pararufata Razowski, 2009
- Sycacantha penthrana (Bradley, 1965)
- Sycacantha placida (Meyrick, 1911)
- Sycacantha platymolybdis (Meyrick, 1930)
- Sycacantha potamographa Diakonoff, 1968
- Sycacantha praeclara Diakonoff, 1973
- Sycacantha quadrata Diakonoff, 1973
- Sycacantha regionalis (Meyrick, 1934)
- Sycacantha rhodocroca Diakonoff, 1973
- Sycacantha rivulosa (Diakonoff, 1953)
- Sycacantha rotundata Diakonoff, 1983
- Sycacantha rufescens Diakonoff, 1973
- Sycacantha siamensis Diakonoff, 1971
- Sycacantha solemnis Diakonoff, 1973
- Sycacantha sphaerocosmana (Meyrick, 1881)
- Sycacantha subiecta Diakonoff, 1973
- Sycacantha symplecta (Turner, 1946)
- Sycacantha tapaenophyes Diakonoff, 1973
- Sycacantha thermographa Diakonoff, 1973
- Sycacantha tornophanes (Meyrick, 1930)
- Sycacantha versicolor Diakonoff, 1973

== See also ==
- List of Tortricidae genera
