= Sycacantha orphnogenes =

Scientific classification
- Kingdom: Animalia
- Phylum: Arthropoda
- Class: Insecta
- Order: Lepidoptera
- Family: Tortricidae
- Genus: Sycacantha
- Species: S. orphnogenes

Binomial name
- Sycacantha orphnogenes (Meyrick, 1939)

Synonyms
- Eucosma orphnogenes Meyrick, 1939

Species of moth

Sycacantha orphnogenes is a species of moth of the family Tortricidae. It is found in the Democratic Republic of the Congo.

The larvae feed on Acanthus arboreus.
