= Sycacantha regionalis =

Scientific classification
- Kingdom: Animalia
- Phylum: Arthropoda
- Class: Insecta
- Order: Lepidoptera
- Family: Tortricidae
- Genus: Sycacantha
- Species: S. regionalis

Binomial name
- Sycacantha regionalis (Meyrick, 1934)

Synonyms
- Eucosma regionalis Meyrick, 1934

Species of moth

Sycacantha regionalis is a species of moth of the family Tortricidae. It is found in the Democratic Republic of the Congo.
