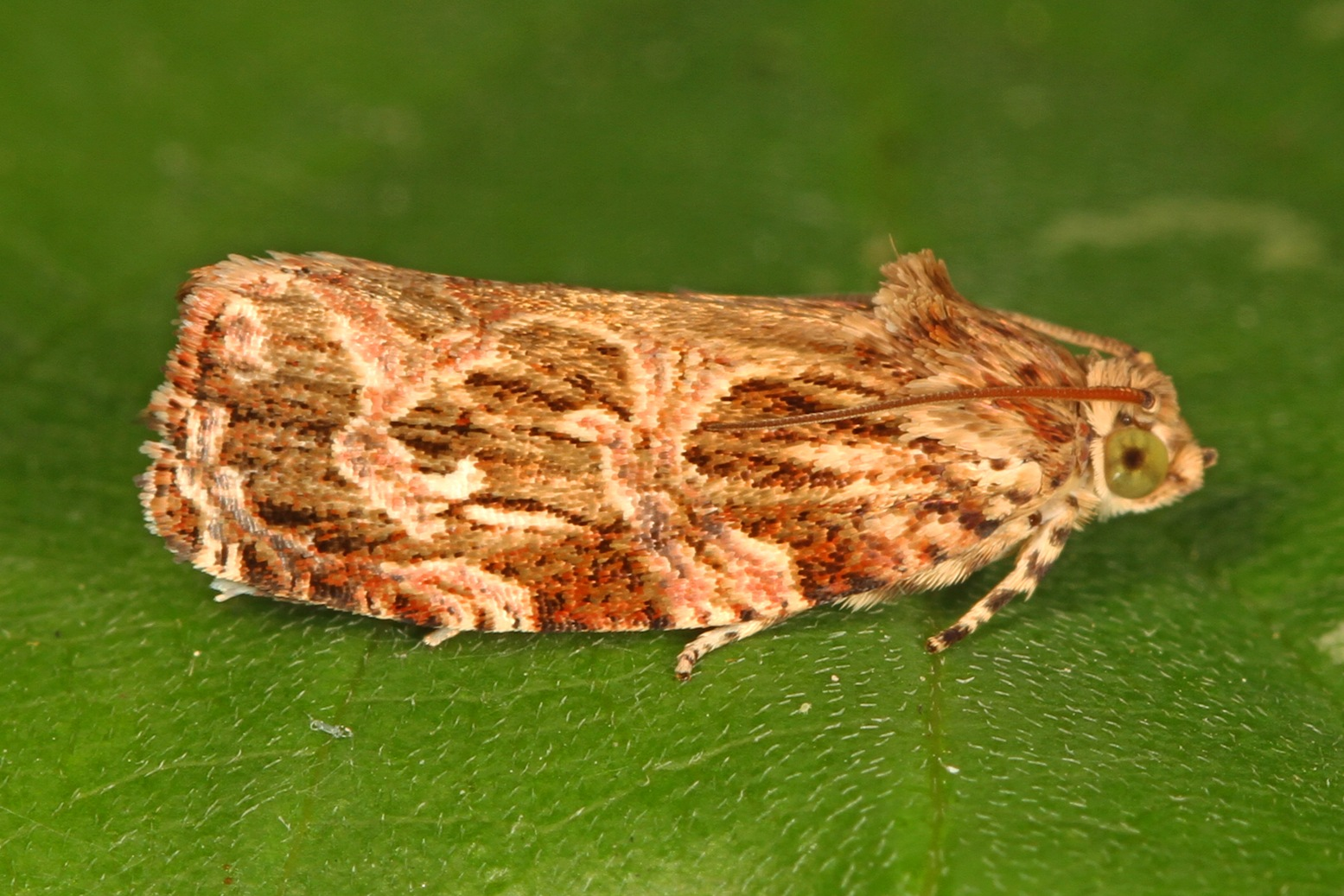

Scientific classification
- Kingdom: Animalia
- Phylum: Arthropoda
- Class: Insecta
- Order: Lepidoptera
- Family: Tortricidae
- Genus: Phaecasiophora
- Species: P. confixana

Binomial name
- Phaecasiophora confixana Walker, 1863

= Phaecasiophora confixana =

Species of moth

Phaecasiophora confixana, the macramé moth, is a species of tortricid moth in the family Tortricidae.

The MONA or Hodges number for Phaecasiophora confixana is 2771.
