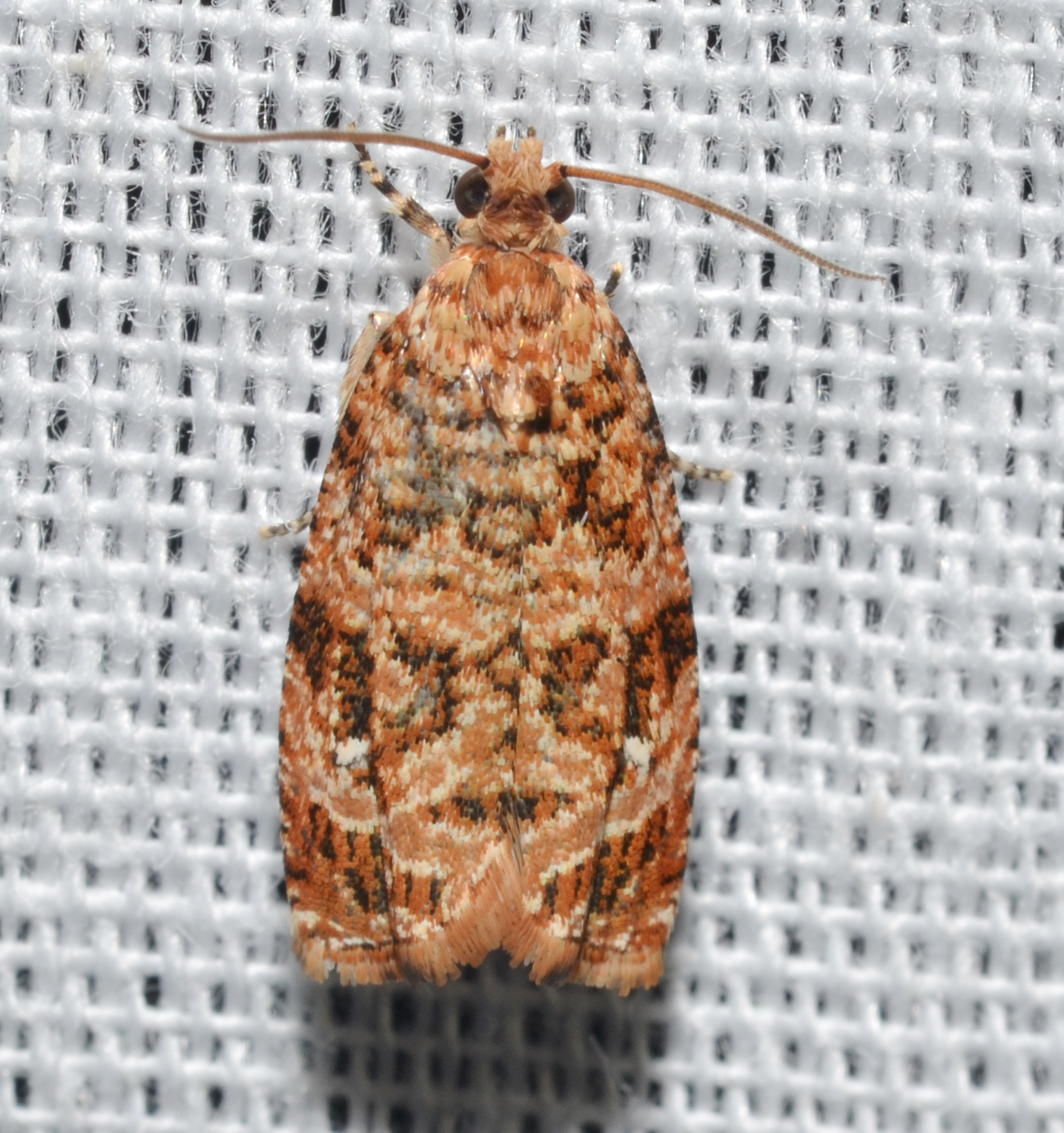
- Adult

Scientific classification
- Domain: Eukaryota
- Kingdom: Animalia
- Phylum: Arthropoda
- Class: Insecta
- Order: Lepidoptera
- Family: Tortricidae
- Genus: Phaecasiophora
- Species: P. niveiguttana

Binomial name
- Phaecasiophora niveiguttana Grote, 1873

= Phaecasiophora niveiguttana =

Species of moth

Phaecasiophora niveiguttana, commonly known as the labyrinth moth, is a species of moth in the family Tortricidae. The MONA or Hodges number for Phaecasiophora niveiguttana is 2772.
