= Phaecasiophora walsinghami =

Scientific classification
- Domain: Eukaryota
- Kingdom: Animalia
- Phylum: Arthropoda
- Class: Insecta
- Order: Lepidoptera
- Family: Tortricidae
- Genus: Phaecasiophora
- Species: P. walsinghami

Binomial name
- Phaecasiophora walsinghami Diakonoff, 1959

Species of moth

Phaecasiophora walsinghami is a moth of the family Tortricidae. It is found in Thailand and western Java.
