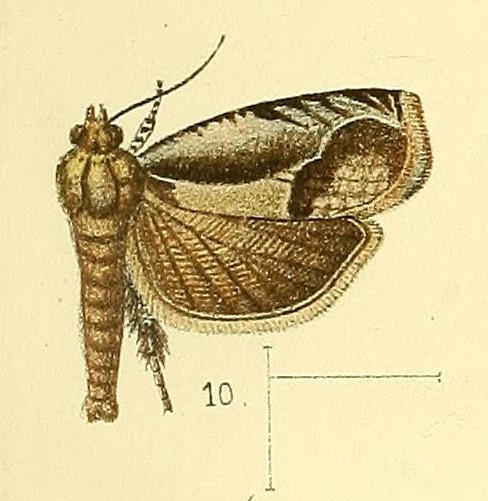
- Phaecasiophora variabilis

Scientific classification
- Kingdom: Animalia
- Phylum: Arthropoda
- Class: Insecta
- Order: Lepidoptera
- Family: Tortricidae
- Tribe: Olethreutini
- Genus: Phaecasiophora; Grote, 1873

= Phaecasiophora =

Genus of tortrix moths

Phaecasiophora is a genus of moths belonging to the subfamily Olethreutinae of the family Tortricidae.

== Species ==
- Phaecasiophora amoena Kawabe, 1986
- Phaecasiophora astrata Razowski, 2009
- Phaecasiophora astrosema (Meyrick, 1909)
- Phaecasiophora attica (Meyrick, 1907)
- Phaecasiophora auroraegera Diakonoff, 1983
- Phaecasiophora basicornis Walsingham, 1891
- Phaecasiophora caelatrix Diakonoff, 1983
- Phaecasiophora caryosema (Meyrick, 1931)
- Phaecasiophora confixana (Walker, 1863)
- Phaecasiophora cornigera Diakonoff, 1959
- Phaecasiophora curvicosta Yu & Li, 2006
- Phaecasiophora decolor Diakonoff, 1983
- Phaecasiophora diluta Diakonoff, 1973
- Phaecasiophora diserta (Meyrick, 1909)
- Phaecasiophora ectropa Diakonoff, 1973
- Phaecasiophora euchlanis Razowski, 2009
- Phaecasiophora fernaldana Walsingham, 1900
- Phaecasiophora finitimana Kuznetzov, 1997
- Phaecasiophora inspersa Heinrich, 1931
- Phaecasiophora jubilans Diakonoff, 1959
- Phaecasiophora kurokoi Kawabe, 1989
- Phaecasiophora leechi Diakonoff, 1973
- Phaecasiophora levis Yu & Li, 2006
- Phaecasiophora lushina Yu & Li, 2006
- Phaecasiophora maculosana Kuznetzov, 1997
- Phaecasiophora niveiguttana Grote, 1873
- Phaecasiophora obraztsovi Diakonoff, 1973
- Phaecasiophora pertexta (Meyrick, 1920)
- Phaecasiophora pyragra Diakonoff, 1973
- Phaecasiophora roseana (Walsingham, 1900)
- Phaecasiophora rufata Razowski, 2009
- Phaecasiophora similithaiensis Yu & Li, 2006
- Phaecasiophora supparallelica Yu & Li, 2006
- Phaecasiophora thaiensis Kawabe, 1987
- Phaecasiophora turmaria (Meyrick, 1931)
- Phaecasiophora variabilis Walsingham, 1891
- Phaecasiophora walsinghami Diakonoff, 1959

== See also ==
- List of Tortricidae genera
