= Sycacantha nereidopa =

Scientific classification
- Kingdom: Animalia
- Phylum: Arthropoda
- Class: Insecta
- Order: Lepidoptera
- Family: Tortricidae
- Genus: Sycacantha
- Species: S. nereidopa

Binomial name
- Sycacantha nereidopa (Meyrick, 1927)

Synonyms
- Eucosma nereidopa Meyrick, 1927; Cosmetra nereidopa; Polychrosis hendrickxi Ghesquière, 1940; Lobesia hendrickxi; Sycacantha hendrickxi; Eucosma phylloscia Meyrick, 1937

Species of moth

Sycacantha nereidopa is a species of moth of the family Tortricidae. It is found in the Democratic Republic of the Congo, Kenya and Uganda.

The larvae feed on the fruit of Coffea species, including Coffea arabica.
