= Phaecasiophora pertexta =

Scientific classification
- Kingdom: Animalia
- Phylum: Arthropoda
- Class: Insecta
- Order: Lepidoptera
- Family: Tortricidae
- Genus: Phaecasiophora
- Species: P. pertexta

Binomial name
- Phaecasiophora pertexta (Meyrick, 1920)

Synonyms
- Argyroploce pertexta Meyrick, 1920; Phaecasiophora guttulosa Diakonoff, 1973

Species of moth

Phaecasiophora pertexta is a moth of the family Tortricidae. It is found in Vietnam and India.
