= Sycacantha exedra =

Scientific classification
- Domain: Eukaryota
- Kingdom: Animalia
- Phylum: Arthropoda
- Class: Insecta
- Order: Lepidoptera
- Family: Tortricidae
- Genus: Sycacantha
- Species: S. exedra

Binomial name
- Sycacantha exedra (Turner, 1916)

Synonyms
- Argyroploce exedra Turner, 1916; Argyroploce irrorea Lower, 1916

Species of moth

Sycacantha exedra is a species of moth of the family Tortricidae. It is found in Australia, where it has been recorded from Queensland.

The wingspan is about 18 mm.
