= Sycacantha ngoclinhana =

Scientific classification
- Domain: Eukaryota
- Kingdom: Animalia
- Phylum: Arthropoda
- Class: Insecta
- Order: Lepidoptera
- Family: Tortricidae
- Genus: Sycacantha
- Species: S. ngoclinhana

Binomial name
- Sycacantha ngoclinhana Razowski, 2009

Species of moth

Sycacantha ngoclinhana is a moth of the family Tortricidae. It is found in Vietnam.

The wingspan is about 18.5 mm.

== Etymology ==
The name refers to the type locality.
