= Sycacantha diakonoffi =

Scientific classification
- Kingdom: Animalia
- Phylum: Arthropoda
- Class: Insecta
- Order: Lepidoptera
- Family: Tortricidae
- Genus: Sycacantha
- Species: S. diakonoffi

Binomial name
- Sycacantha diakonoffi Kawabe, 1987

Species of moth

Sycacantha diakonoffi is a moth of the family Tortricidae. It is found in Thailand and Vietnam.
