= Phaecasiophora astrata =

Scientific classification
- Domain: Eukaryota
- Kingdom: Animalia
- Phylum: Arthropoda
- Class: Insecta
- Order: Lepidoptera
- Family: Tortricidae
- Genus: Phaecasiophora
- Species: P. astrata

Binomial name
- Phaecasiophora astrata Razowski, 2009

Species of moth

Phaecasiophora astrata is a moth of the family Tortricidae. It is found in Vietnam.

The wingspan is about 23 mm.
