= Phaecasiophora euchlanis =

Scientific classification
- Domain: Eukaryota
- Kingdom: Animalia
- Phylum: Arthropoda
- Class: Insecta
- Order: Lepidoptera
- Family: Tortricidae
- Genus: Phaecasiophora
- Species: P. euchlanis

Binomial name
- Phaecasiophora euchlanis Razowski, 2009

Species of moth

Phaecasiophora euchlanis is a moth of the family Tortricidae. It is found in Vietnam.

The wingspan is 26 mm.

== Etymology ==
The name is derived from Greek euchlana (meaning a thin overcoat).
