= Sycacantha sphaerocosmana =

Scientific classification
- Kingdom: Animalia
- Phylum: Arthropoda
- Class: Insecta
- Order: Lepidoptera
- Family: Tortricidae
- Genus: Sycacantha
- Species: S. sphaerocosmana

Binomial name
- Sycacantha sphaerocosmana (Meyrick, 1881)

Synonyms
- Antithesia sphaerocosmana Meyrick, 1881; Argyroploce eurypolia Turner, 1916

Species of moth

Sycacantha sphaerocosmana is a species of moth of the family Tortricidae. It is found in Australia, where it has been recorded from Queensland.

The wingspan is about 19 mm. The forewings are pale ochreous grey with a reddish-brown basal patch mixed with purple fuscous. The hindwings are fuscous.
