= Phaecasiophora cornigera =

Scientific classification
- Domain: Eukaryota
- Kingdom: Animalia
- Phylum: Arthropoda
- Class: Insecta
- Order: Lepidoptera
- Family: Tortricidae
- Genus: Phaecasiophora
- Species: P. cornigera

Binomial name
- Phaecasiophora cornigera Diakonoff, 1959

Species of moth

Phaecasiophora cornigera is a moth of the family Tortricidae. It is found in Vietnam China, Burma, Taiwan and India.

== Subspecies ==
- Phaecasiophora cornigera cornigera (India)
- Phaecasiophora cornigera birmensis Diakonoff, 1959 (Burma, Vietnam)
