= Phaecasiophora attica =

Scientific classification
- Kingdom: Animalia
- Phylum: Arthropoda
- Class: Insecta
- Order: Lepidoptera
- Family: Tortricidae
- Genus: Phaecasiophora
- Species: P. attica

Binomial name
- Phaecasiophora attica (Meyrick, 1907)

Synonyms
- Eucosma attica Meyrick, 1907

Species of moth

Phaecasiophora attica is a moth of the family Tortricidae. It is found in India (Assam), China, Burma, Thailand, Taiwan, Vietnam and Japan.
