= Sycacantha penthrana =

Scientific classification
- Domain: Eukaryota
- Kingdom: Animalia
- Phylum: Arthropoda
- Class: Insecta
- Order: Lepidoptera
- Family: Tortricidae
- Genus: Sycacantha
- Species: S. penthrana

Binomial name
- Sycacantha penthrana (Bradley, 1965)

Synonyms
- Epinotia penthrana Bradley, 1965

Species of moth

Sycacantha penthrana is a species of moth of the family Tortricidae. It is found in Uganda.
