= Sycacantha escharota =

Scientific classification
- Kingdom: Animalia
- Phylum: Arthropoda
- Class: Insecta
- Order: Lepidoptera
- Family: Tortricidae
- Genus: Sycacantha
- Species: S. escharota

Binomial name
- Sycacantha escharota (Meyrick, 1910)

Synonyms
- Argyroploce escharota Meyrick, 1910

Species of moth

Sycacantha escharota is a species of moth of the family Tortricidae first described by Edward Meyrick in 1910. It is found on the Indonesian islands of Sulawesi and Seram. The habitat consists of bamboo and secondary forests.
