= Phaecasiophora rufata =

Scientific classification
- Domain: Eukaryota
- Kingdom: Animalia
- Phylum: Arthropoda
- Class: Insecta
- Order: Lepidoptera
- Family: Tortricidae
- Genus: Phaecasiophora
- Species: P. rufata

Binomial name
- Phaecasiophora rufata Razowski, 2009

Species of moth

Phaecasiophora rufata is a moth of the family Tortricidae. It is found in Vietnam.

The wingspan is about 19 mm.
