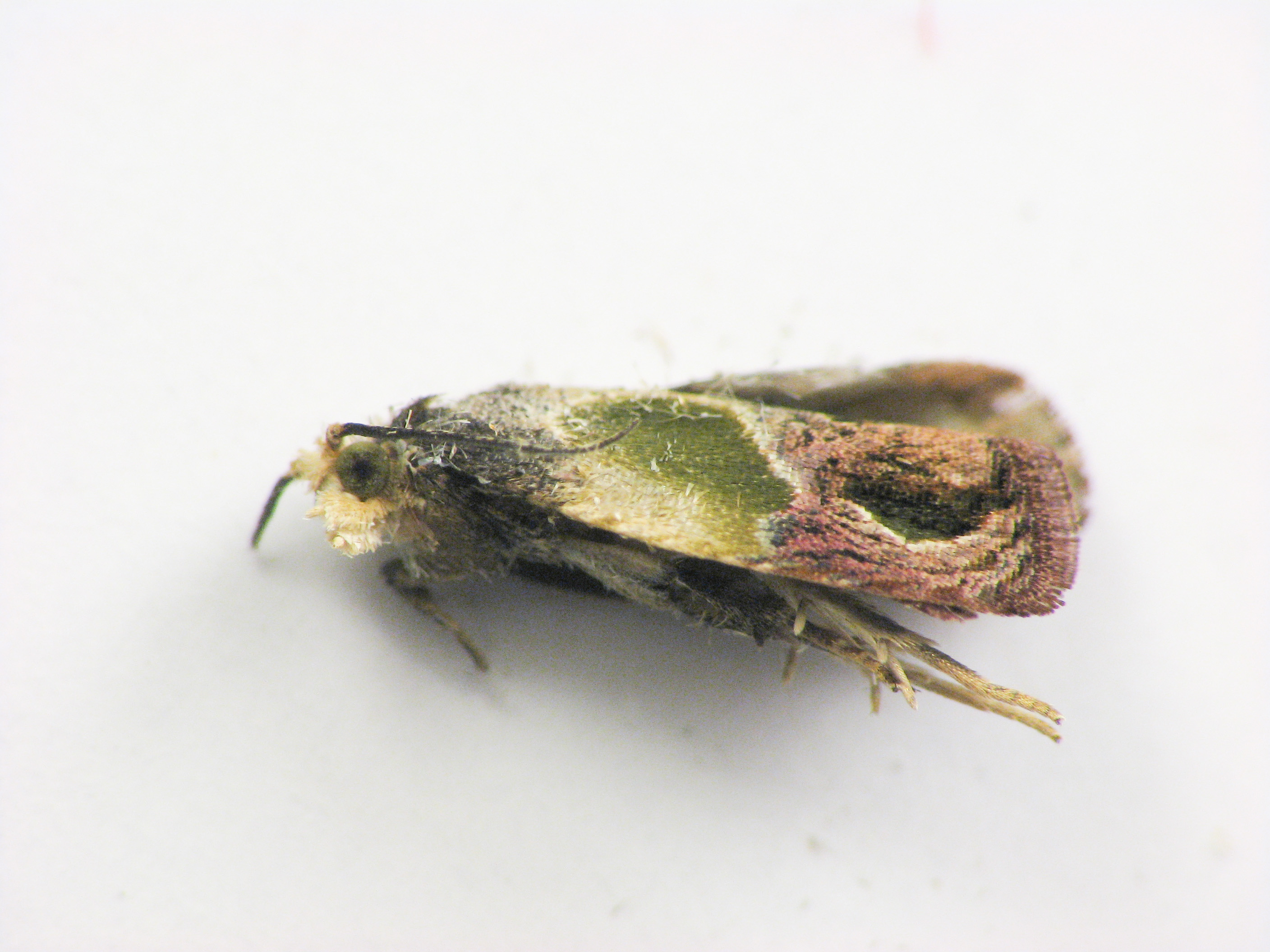
- Eumarozia malachitana

Scientific classification
- Kingdom: Animalia
- Phylum: Arthropoda
- Clade: Pancrustacea
- Class: Insecta
- Order: Lepidoptera
- Family: Tortricidae
- Subfamily: Olethreutinae
- Tribe: Olethreutini; Walsingham, 1895

Genera
- See text

Synonyms
- Syricorinae Guenee, 1845; Eudemini Falkovitsh, 1962; Lobesiini Falkovitsh, 1962; Rhodocosmariina Diakonoff, 1973; Zomariina Diakonoff, 1973; Sorolophina Diakonoff, 1973; Sycacanthina Diakonoff, 1973; Statherotina Diakonoff, 1973; Neopotamiina Diakonoff, 1973

= Olethreutini =

Tribe of moths

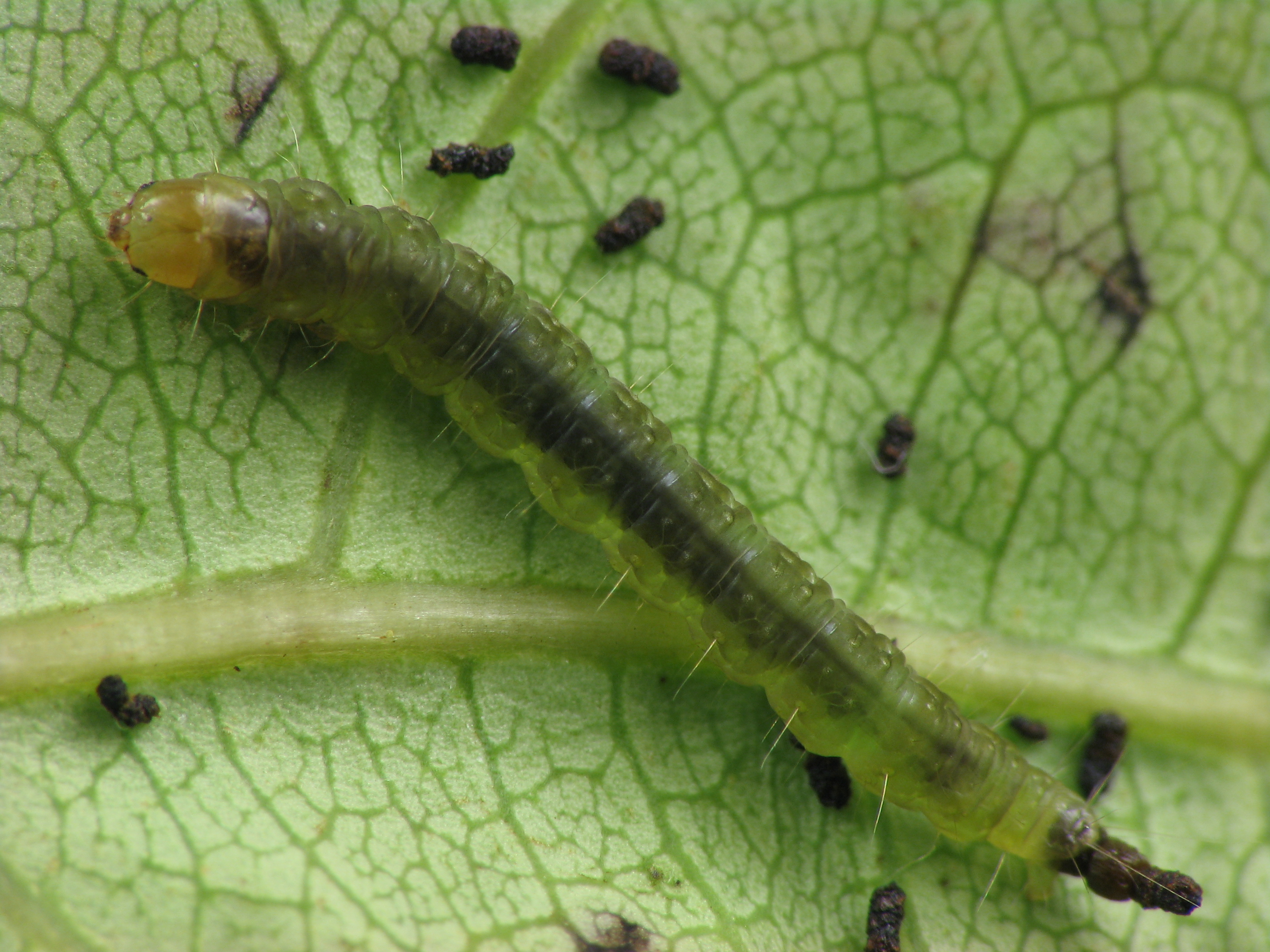
Eumarozia malachitana larva

The Olethreutini are a tribe of tortrix moths.

== Genera ==
Acantheucosma
Actinocentra
Afrocostosa
Afroploce
Afrothreutes
Ahmosia
Alexiloga
Antaeola
Antirrhopa
Apolobesia
Apotomis
Apsidophora
Arcesis
Archilobesia
Argyroploce
Asaphistis
Astronauta
Aterpia
Atriscripta
Atrypsiastis
Baburia
Basigonia
Bucephalacra
Cacocharis
Camptrodoxa
Capricornia
Celypha
Cephalophyes
Cnecidophora
Coccothera
Cosmopoda
Cosmorrhyncha
Costosa
Cymolomia
Dactylioglypha
Diakonoffiana
Dicephalarcha
Dolichohedya
Dudua
Dynatorhabda
Eccopsis
Engelana
Episimus
Eppihus
Eremas
Eubrochoneura
Eudemis
Eudemopsis
Eumarozia
Euobraztsovia
Evora
Fansipaniana
Geita
Gnathmocerodes
Gonomomera
Hedya
Hilaroptila
Hopliteccopsis
Hoplitendemis
Hystrichoscelus
Lepidunca
Lipsotelus
Lobesia
Lobesiodes
Megalomacha
Megalota
Meiligma
Mesocharis
Metendothenia
Metrioglypha
Neohermenias
Neopotamia
Neorrhyncha
Neostatherotis
Nepheloploce
Niphadophylax
Oestropa
Olethreutes
Omiostola
Ophiorrhabda
Orientophiaris
Orthotaenia
Oxysemaphora
Palaeomorpha
Paraeccopsis
Paralobesia
Pelatea
Penthostola
Phaecadophora
Phaecasiophora
Phaulacantha
Phiaris
Piniphila
Podognatha
Pomatophora
Pristerognatha
Promodra
Prophaecasia
Proschistis
Psegmatica
Pseudohedya
Pseudohermenias
Pseudosciaphila
Psilacantha
Recaraceria
Rhectogonia
Rhodacra
Rhodocosmaria
Rhopaltriplasia
Riculorampha
Rudisociaria
Sambara
Selenodes
Semniotes
Semutophila
Sisona
Socioplana
Sorolopha
Stalagmocroca
Statherotis
Statherotmantis
Statherotoxys
Stenentoma
Stictea
Sycacantha
Syricoris
Taiteccopsis
Teleta
Temnolopha
Theorica
Trachyschistis
Triheteracra
Tsinilla
Xenolepis
Xenopotamia
Zomaria
Zomariana

== Unplaced species ==
- Argyroploce percnochlaena Meyrick, 1938
