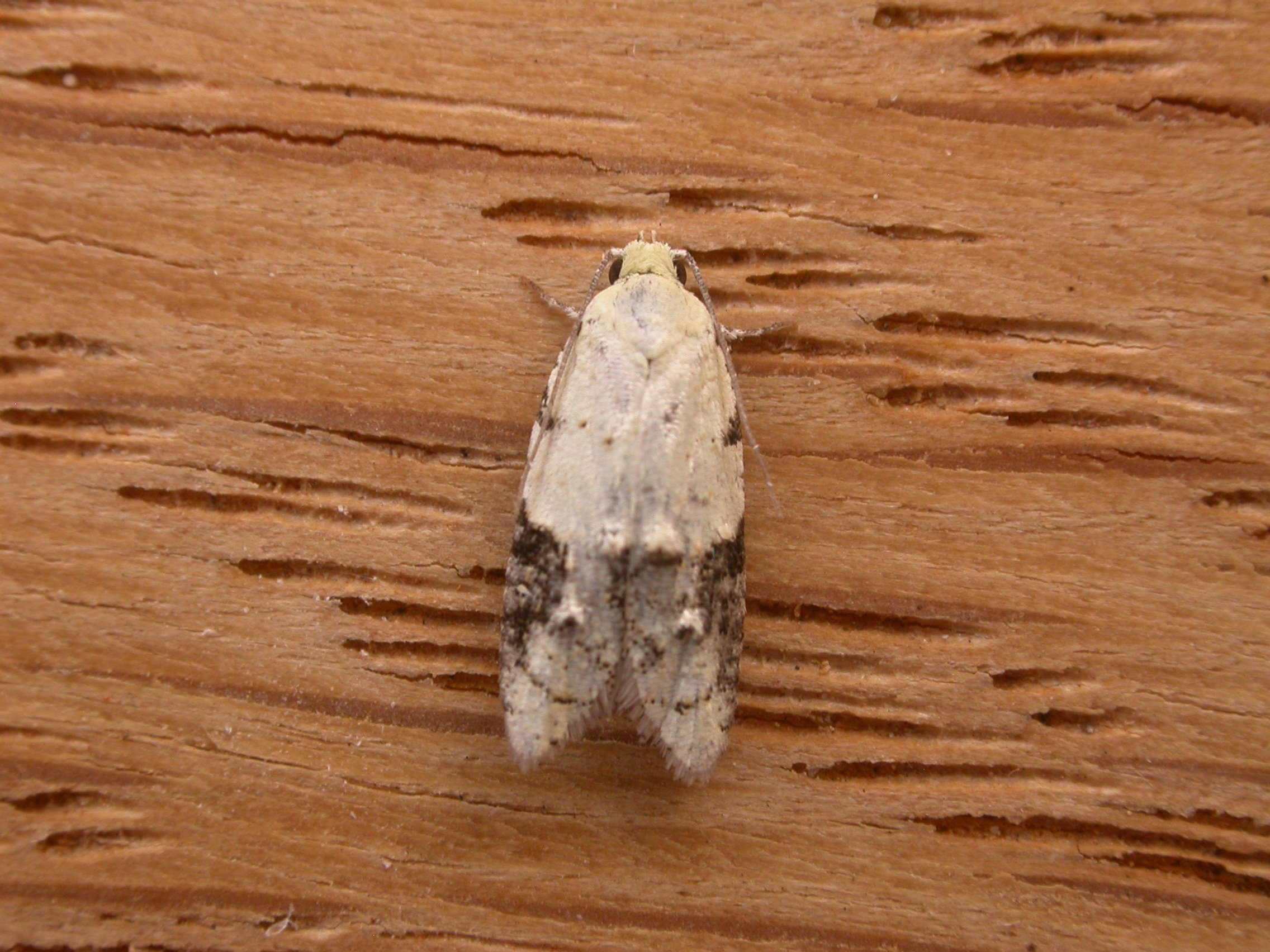
- Tracholena sulfurosa

Scientific classification
- Domain: Eukaryota
- Kingdom: Animalia
- Phylum: Arthropoda
- Class: Insecta
- Order: Lepidoptera
- Family: Tortricidae
- Subfamily: Tortricinae
- Tribe: Schoenotenini; Diakonoff, 1952

Genera
- See text

= Schoenotenini =

Tribe of moths

The Schoenotenini are a tribe of tortrix moths.

== Genera ==
There are 35 genera in the tribe Schoenotenini.

Antigraptis
Aphrozestis
Archactenis
Barygnathella
Brongersmia
Campotenes
Choristenes
Copidostoma
Cornuticlava
Diactenis
Dipterina
Doridostoma
Epitrichosma
Homalernis
Litotenes
Maoritenes
Metachorista
Neotenes
Nesoscopa
Oligotenes
Palaeotoma
Proactenis
Proselena
Protarchella
Prothelymna
Rhabdotenes
Rhopalotenes
Saetotenes
Schoenotenes
Snodgrassia
Stenarchella
Stenotenes
Syncratus
Tracholena
Xenotenes
