= List of Tortricidae genera =

This is a taxonomy of the moth family Tortricidae down to genus level. This classification is up-to-date to 2008, taking information from the Online World Catalogue of the Tortricidae and taxonomic changes made in 2007.

== Subfamily Tortricinae ==
=== Tribe Archipini ===
- Abrepagoge
- Acroceuthes
- Acropolitis
- Adoxophyes
- Allodemis
- Ancyroclepsis
- Aneuxanthis
- Anisotenes
- Anthophrys
- Antiphrastis
- Aphelia
- Aphthonocosma
- Archepandemis
- Archidemis
- Archips
- Argyrotaenia
- Aristocosma
- Arizelana
- Ascerodes
- Asteriognatha
- Atelodora
- Authomaema
- Avaria
- Bactrostoma
- Balioxena
- Battalia
- Borboniella
- Borneogena
- Brachyvalva
- Cacoecimorpha
- Callibryastis
- Capua
- Carphomigma
- Catamacta
- Ceramea
- Ceritaenia
- Chionothremma
- Chiraps
- Choanograptis
- Choristoneura
- Claduncaria
- Clepsis
- Coeloptera
- Cornuclepsis
- Cornusaccula
- Cosmiophrys
- Cryptomelaena
- Cryptoptila
- Ctenopseustis
- Cudonigera
- Cununcus
- Cuspidata
- Daemilus
- Dentisociaria
- Diactora
- Dicanticinta
- Dicellitis
- Dichelia
- Dichelopa
- Diedra
- Digitosa
- Diplocalyptis
- Ditula
- Droceta
- Durangarchips
- Dynatocephala
- Ecclitica
- Egogepa
- Electraglaia
- Epagoge
- Epalxiphora
- Epichorista
- Epichoristodes
- Epiphyas
- Ericodesma
- Eurythecta
- Exorstaenia
- Furcataenia
- Furcinula
- Gelophaula
- Geogepa
- Gephyraspis
- Glyphidoptera
- Gnorismoneura
- Gongylotypa
- Goniotorna
- Harmologa
- Hectaphelia
- Heterochorista
- Hiceteria
- Homona
- Homonoides
- Homonopsis
- Hypsidracon
- Idolatteria
- Isochorista
- Isodemis
- Isotenes
- Labidosa
- Leontochroma
- Leptochroptila
- Leucotenes
- Lozotaenia
- Lozotaeniodes
- Lumaria
- Mantua
- Meridemis
- Merophyas
- Mesocalyptis
- Metamesia
- Midaellobes
- Minutargyrotoza
- Neocalyptis
- Niphothixa
- Notioclepsis
- Nuritamburia
- Ochetarcha
- Ochrotaenia
- Orilesa
- Panaphelix
- Pandemis
- Paradichelia
- Paramesia
- Paramesiodes
- Paraphasis
- Pararrhaptica
- Periclepsis
- Peteliacma
- Petridia
- Phaenacropista
- Philedone
- Philedonides
- Philocryptica
- Phlebozemia
- Planostocha
- Planotortrix
- Platyhomonopsis
- Platysemaphora
- Procalyptis
- Procrica
- Pseudeulia
- Pteridoporthis
- Pternozyga
- Ptycholoma
- Ptycholomoides
- Pyrgotis
- Pyrsarcha
- Saetotaenia
- Scotiophyes
- Snodgrassia
- Sorensenata
- Spheterista
- Spinotaenia
- Sychnochlaena
- Sychnovalva
- Syndemis
- Tacertaenia
- Terricula
- Terthreutis
- Thrincophora
- Tosirips
- Tremophora
- Tuckia
- Ulodemis
- Vialonga
- Viettea
- Williella
- Worcesteria
- Xeneda
- Xenophylla
- Xenotemna
- Xenothictis
- Zacorisca

=== Tribe Atteriini ===
- Anacrusis
- Archipimima
- Atteria
- Holoptygma
- Sisurcana
- Templemania
- Tina
- Tinacrucis

=== Tribe Ceracini ===
- Bathypluta
- Cerace
- Eurydoxa
- Pentacitrotus

=== Tribe Cnephasiini ===
- Amphicoecia
- Archicnephasia
- Astrosa
- Cnephasia
- Decodes
- Decodina
- Doloploca
- Drachmobola
- Eana
- Epicnephasia
- Exapate
- Immariana
- Kawabea
- Mictoneura
- Neosphaleroptera
- Oxypteron
- Paranepsia
- Propiromorpha
- Protopterna
- Pseudargyrotoza
- Sphaleroptera
- Stenopteron
- Synochoneura
- Taeniarchis
- Tortricodes
- Xerocnephasia

=== Tribe Cochylini ===
- Acarolella
- Actihema
- Aethes
- Aethesoides
- Agapeta
- Amallectis
- Anielia
- Aphalonia
- Aprepodoxa
- Banhadoa
- Belemgena
- Caraccochylis
- Carolella
- Cartagogena
- Ceratoxanthis
- Chloanohieris
- Cirrothaumatia
- Cochylidia
- Cochylidichnium
- Cochylimorpha
- Cochylis
- Combosclera
- Commophila
- Coristaca
- Cryptocochylis
- Deltophalonia
- Diceratura
- Dinophalia
- Empedcochylis
- Enallcochylis
- Eugnosta
- Eupoecilia
- Falseuncaria
- Fulvoclysia
- Geitocochylis
- Gryposcleroma
- Gynnidomorpha
- Henricus
- Hypostromatia
- Hysterophora
- Juxtolena
- Lasiothyris
- Lincicochylis
- Lorita
- Maricaona
- Marylinka
- Mielkeana
- Mimcochylis
- Mimeugnosta
- Monoceratuncus
- Mourecochylis
- Oligobalia
- Parirazona
- Perlorita
- Phalonidia
- Phaniola
- Phtheochroa
- Phtheochroides
- Planaltinella
- Platphalonidia
- Prochlidonia
- Prohysterophora
- Revertuncaria
- Rigidsociaria
- Rolandylis
- Rudenia
- Saphenista
- Spinipogon
- Tambomachaya
- Tenoa
- Thyraylia
- Thysanphalonia
- Trachybyrsis
- Velhoania
- Vermilphalonia

=== Tribe Epitymbiini ===
- Aeolostoma
- Anisogona
- Aplastoceros
- Apoctena
- Asthenoptycha
- Capnoptycha
- Cleptacaca
- Epitymbia
- Goboea
- Macrothyma
- Meritastis
- Mimeoclysia
- Pandurista
- Polydrachma
- Rhomboceros
- Sperchia
- Trychnophylla

=== Tribe Euliini ===
- Abancaya
- Accuminulia
- Acmanthina
- Acroplectis
- Albadea
- Anopina
- Anopinella
- Apolychrosis
- Apotomops
- Argentulia
- Atepa
- Badiaria
- Belemclepsis
- Bicavernaria
- Bidorpitia
- Bolbia
- Bonagota
- Brazeulia
- Brusqeulia
- Chamelania
- Chapoania
- Characovalva
- Chicotortrix
- Chileulia
- Chilips
- Chinchipena
- Chrysoxena
- Cincorunia
- Circapina
- Clarkenia
- Clarkeulia
- Colosyta
- Corneulia
- Coryssovalva
- Crocotania
- Cuproxena
- Cylichneulia
- Deltinea
- Deltobathra
- Dimorphopalpa
- Ditrifa
- Dogolion
- Dorithia
- Ecnomiomorpha
- Eliachna
- Eriotortrix
- Eristparcula
- Ernocornutia
- Ernocornutina
- Eubetia
- Eulia
- Euryeulia
- Ewunia
- Exoletuncus
- Galomecalpa
- Gauruncus
- Gnatheulia
- Gorytvesica
- Gravitcornutia
- Haemateulia
- Harposcleritia
- Hasteulia
- Helicteulia
- Hynhamia
- Hypenolobosa
- Hyptiharpa
- Icteralaria
- Imelcana
- Inape
- Joaquima
- Lanacerta
- Limeulia
- Liobba
- Lobogenesis
- Lydontopa
- Marcelina
- Meridulia
- Meyathorybia
- Moneulia
- Monimosocia
- Monochamia
- Moronanita
- Moronata
- Neoeulia
- Neomarkia
- Nesochoris
- Netechma
- Netechmina
- Netechmodes
- Nunimeus
- Odonthalitus
- Oregocerata
- Ortognathosia
- Oryguncus
- Ozotuncus
- Palusita
- Paramonochamia
- Paraneulia
- Paraptila
- Paratepa
- Parexoletuncus
- Pinhaisania
- Placabis
- Popayanita
- Proathorybia
- Proeulia
- Psedaleulia
- Pseudapina
- Pseudomeritastis
- Psiathovalva
- Ptoseulia
- Ptychocroca
- Ptyongnathosia
- Punctapinella
- Punoa
- Pycnocornuta
- Quasieulia
- Ramaperta
- Ranapa
- Razowskiina
- Rebinea
- Recintona
- Rhythmologa
- Romanaria
- Rubroxena
- Saetosacculina
- Sagittranstilla
- Saopaulista
- Searenia
- Seticosta
- Simanica
- Sinxema
- Strophotina
- Subrebinea
- Subterinebrica
- Subtranstillaspis
- Tapinodoxa
- Telurips
- Terinebrica
- Thalleulia
- Thoridia
- Toreulia
- Transtillaspis
- Tylopeza
- Uelia
- Ulvipinara
- Uncicida
- Varifula
- Vulpoxena
- Xoser

=== Tribe Phricanthini ===
- Chersomorpha
- Denaeantha
- Phricanthes
- Scolioplecta

=== Tribe Schoenotenini ===
- Antigraptis
- Aphrozestis
- Archactenis
- Barygnathella
- Brongersmia
- Campotenes
- Choristenes
- Copidostoma
- Cornuticlava
- Diactenis
- Dipterina
- Doridostoma
- Epitrichosma
- Homalernis
- Litotenes
- Maoritenes
- Metachorista
- Neotenes
- Nesoscopa
- Oligotenes
- Palaeotoma
- Proactenis
- Proselena
- Protarchella
- Prothelymna
- Rhabdotenes
- Rhopalotenes
- Saetotenes
- Schoenotenes
- Stenarchella
- Stenotenes
- Syncratus
- Tracholena
- Xenotenes

=== Tribe Sparganothini ===
- Aesiocopa
- Amorbia
- Anchicremna
- Coelostathma
- Lambertiodes
- Niasoma
- Paramorbia
- Platynota
- Rhynchophyllis
- Sparganopseustis
- Sparganothina
- Sparganothis
- Sparganothoides
- Spatalistiforma
- Syllonoma
- Synalocha
- Synnoma

=== Tribe Tortricini ===
- Accra
- Acleris
- Aleimma
- Algoforma
- Amboyna
- Anaccra
- Anameristes
- Apotoforma
- Archigraptis
- Asterolepis
- Beryllophantis
- Brachiolia
- Cnesteboda
- Cornesia
- Eboda
- Elaeodina
- Exeristeboda
- Herotyda
- Latibulocrinis
- Nephograptis
- Panegyra
- Paraccra
- Paracroesia
- Paratorna
- Pareboda
- Plinthograptis
- Polemograptis
- Pseudeboda
- Pseudocroesia
- Reptilisocia
- Rubidograptis
- Rubrograptis
- Russograptis
- Rutilograptis
- Sanguinograptis
- Sclerodisca
- Sociosa
- Spatalistis
- Tortrix
- Transita
- Trophocosta
- Tymbarcha
- Vellonifer

=== Unplaced ===
- Alytopistis
- Anisolepida
- Apateta
- Apinoglossa
- Arotrophora
- Camadeniana
- Hydaranthes
- Ioditis
- Mictopsichia
- Matronula
- Orthocomotis
- Paracomotis
- Paraphyas
- Parastranga
- Peraglyphis
- Scyphoceros
- Syllomatia
- Symphygas
- Tanychaeta

== Subfamily Olethreutinae ==
=== Tribe Bactrini ===
- Bactra
- Cyclacanthina
- Henioloba
- Parabactra
- Syntozyga

=== Tribe Enarmoniini ===
- Aemulatrix
- Aglaogonia
- Anathamna
- Ancylis
- Ancylophyes
- Anthozela
- Argyroptocha
- Balbidomaga
- Bubonoxena
- Cimeliomorpha
- Corethrarcha
- Crocostola
- Cyphophanes
- Dasodis
- Dasybregma
- Embolostoma
- Enarmonia
- Enarmoniodes
- Enarmonodes
- Eucosmogastra
- Eucosmomorpha
- Fibuloides
- Ganabalia
- Genetancylis
- Helictophanes
- Heteroschistis
- Hystrichophora
- Irianassa
- Loboschiza
- Mehteria
- Metaselena
- Neoanathamna
- Nenomoshia
- Oriodryas
- Periphoeba
- Protancylis
- Pseudacroclita
- Pseudancylis
- Pseudophiaris
- Pternidora
- Ruthita
- Semnostola
- Sillybiphora
- Taiwancylis
- Tetramoera
- Thymioptila
- Thysanocrepis
- Tokuana
- Toonavora

=== Tribe Endotheniini ===
- Endothenia
- Hulda
- Saliciphaga
- Taniva
- Tia

=== Tribe Eucosmini ===
- Acroclita
- Age
- Alcina
- Alischirnevalia
- Allodapella
- Allohermenias
- Anoecophysis
- Antichlidas
- Argepinotia
- Asketria
- Assulella
- Azuayacana
- Barbara
- Bascaneucosma
- Bathrotoma
- Bipartivalva
- Biuncaria
- Blastesthia
- Blastopetrova
- Brachiocera
- Brachioxena
- Catastega
- Charitostega
- Chimoptesis
- Cirrilaspeyresia
- Clavigesta
- Coenobiodes
- Collogenes
- Cosmetra
- Crimnologa
- Crocidosema
- Crusimetra
- Demeijerella
- Dicnecidia
- Dinogenes
- Diplonearcha
- Dolichurella
- Doliochastis
- Duessa
- Eccoptocera
- Emrahia
- Epibactra
- Epiblema
- Epinotia
- Episimoides
- Eriopsela
- Eucoenogenes
- Eucosma
- Eucosmophyes
- Foveifera
- Gibberifera
- Gravitarmata
- Gretchena
- Gypsonoma
- Gypsonomoides
- Heleanna
- Hendecaneura
- Hendecasticha
- Hermenias
- Herpystis
- Herpystostena
- Holocola
- Hylotropha
- Icelita
- Jerapowellia
- Kennelia
- Lepteucosma
- Macraesthetica
- Makivora
- Megaherpystis
- Melanodaedala
- Metacosma
- Mystogenes
- Namasia
- Neaspasia
- Neobarbara
- Niphadostola
- Noduliferola
- Notocelia
- Nuntiella
- Osthelderiella
- Parachanda
- Parepisimia
- Pelochrista
- Penestostoma
- Peridaedala
- Phalarocarpa
- Phaneta
- Plutographa
- Potiosa
- Proteoteras
- Protithona
- Pseudexentera
- Pseudoclita
- Pseudococcyx
- Retinia
- Rhodotoxotis
- Rhopalovalva
- Rhopobota
- Rhyacionia
- Salsolicola
- Sociognatha
- Sonia
- Spilonota
- Strepsicrates
- Stygitropha
- Suleima
- Syngamoneura
- Syropetrova
- Thiodia
- Thiodiodes
- Thylacogaster
- Tritopterna
- Whittenella
- Xenosocia
- Yunusemreia
- Zeiraphera

=== Tribe Gatesclarkeanini ===
- Asymmetrarcha
- Gatesclarkeana
- Hiroshiinoueana
- Ukamenia

=== Tribe Grapholitini ===
- Acanthoclita
- Agriophanes
- Andrioplecta
- Apocydia
- Archiphlebia
- Articolla
- Bhagwantolita
- Centroxena
- Cirriphora
- Commoneria
- Coniostola
- Corticivora
- Cryptophlebia
- Cryptoschesis
- Cydia
- Dichrorampha
- Dierlia
- Diplosemaphora
- Dracontogena
- Ecdytolopha
- Ethelgoda
- Eucosmocydia
- Fulcrifera
- Goditha
- Grapholita
- Gymnandrosoma
- Hyposarotis
- Ixonympha
- Karacaoglania
- Larisa
- Laspeyresinia
- Lathronympha
- Leguminivora
- Licigena
- Loranthacydia
- Lusterala
- Macrocydia
- Matsumuraeses
- Mevlanaia
- Microsarotis
- Mimarsinania
- Muhabbetina
- Multiquaestia
- Notocydia
- Ofatulena
- Pammene
- Pammenemima
- Pammenitis
- Pammenodes
- Pammenopsis
- Parapammene
- Parienia
- Procoronis
- Pseudogalleria
- Pseudopammene
- Ricula
- Riculoides
- Satronia
- Selania
- Sereda
- Spanistoneura
- Statignatha
- Stephanopyga
- Strophedra
- Strophedromorpha
- Talponia
- Thaumatotibia
- Thylacandra
- Titanotoca

=== Tribe Microcorsini ===
- Cryptaspasma

=== Tribe Olethreutini ===
- Acantheucosma
- Actinocentra
- Afrocostosa
- Afroploce
- Afrothreutes
- Ahmosia
- Alexiloga
- Antaeola
- Antictenista
- Antirrhopa
- Apeleptera
- Apolobesia
- Apotomis
- Apsidophora
- Arcesis
- Archilobesia
- Argyroploce
- Artiphanes
- Asaphistis
- Astronauta
- Aterpia
- Atriscripta
- Atrypsiastis
- Baburia
- Bakia
- Basigonia
- Bucephalacra
- Cacocharis
- Camptrodoxa
- Capricornia
- Cellifera
- Celypha
- Cephalophyes
- Cnecidophora
- Coccothera
- Cosmopoda
- Cosmorrhyncha
- Costosa
- Cymolomia
- Dactylioglypha
- Diakonoffiana
- Dicephalarcha
- Didrimys
- Dolichohedya
- Dudua
- Dynatorhabda
- Eccopsis
- Engelana
- Enveryucelia
- Episimus
- Eppihus
- Eremas
- Eubrochoneura
- Eudemis
- Eudemopsis
- Eumarozia
- Euobraztsovia
- Evora
- Geita
- Gnathmocerodes
- Gonomomera
- Hedya
- Hilaroptila
- Hopliteccopsis
- Hoplitendemis
- Hystrichoscelus
- Lepidunca
- Lipsotelus
- Lobesia
- Lobesiodes
- Megalomacha
- Megalota
- Meiligma
- Mesocharis
- Metendothenia
- Metrioglypha
- Molybdocrates
- Neohermenias
- Neopotamia
- Neorrhyncha
- Neostatherotis
- Niphadophylax
- Oestropa
- Olethreutes
- Omiostola
- Ophiorrhabda
- Orientophiaris
- Orthotaenia
- Oxysemaphora
- Palaeomorpha
- Paraeccopsis
- Paralobesia
- Pelatea
- Penthostola
- Phaecadophora
- Phaecasiophora
- Phaulacantha
- Phiaris
- Piniphila
- Podognatha
- Pomatophora
- Pristerognatha
- Prophaecasia
- Protobactra
- Proschistis
- Psegmatica
- Pseudohedya
- Pseudohermenias
- Pseudosciaphila
- Psilacantha
- Rhectogonia
- Rhodacra
- Rhodocosmaria
- Rhopaltriplasia
- Riculorampha
- Rudisociaria
- Sambara
- Selenodes
- Semniotes
- Semutophila
- Sisona
- Socioplana
- Sorolopha
- Stalagmocroca
- Statheromeris
- Statheromantis
- Statherotis
- Statherotmantis
- Statherotoxys
- Stenentoma
- Stictea
- Sycacantha
- Syricoris
- Teleta
- Temnolopha
- Theorica
- Trachyschistis
- Triheteracra
- Tsinilla
- Xenolepis
- Xenopotamia
- Zomaria
- Zomariana

=== Unplaced ===
- Melanalopha
- Euobraztsovia

== Subfamily Chlidanotinae ==
=== Tribe Chlidanotini ===
- Archimaga
- Auratonota
- Branchophantis
- Caenognosis
- Chlidanota
- Diabolo
- Daulocnema
- Electracma
- Gnaphalostoma
- Heppnerographa
- Iconostigma
- Leurogyia
- Macrochlidia
- Metrernis
- Monortha
- Picroxena
- Pseudocomotis
- Trymalitis
- Utrivalva

=== Tribe Hilarographini ===
- Charitographa
- Hilarographa
- Idiothauma
- Mictocommosis
- Nexosa
- Thaumatographa
- Tortrimosaica

=== Tribe Polyorthini ===
- Apura
- Ardeutica
- Biclonuncaria
- Chlorortha
- Clonuncaria
- Cnephasitis
- Ebodina
- Epelebodina
- Histura
- Histurodes
- Isotrias
- Lopharcha
- Lophoprora
- Lypothora
- Macasinia
- Olindia
- Polylopha
- Polyortha
- Polythora
- Polyvena
- Pseudatteria
- Pseuduncifera
- Scytalognatha
- Thaumatoptila
- Xeneboda

== Unplaced ==
- Electresia
- Hetereucosma
- Laculataria
- Meridagena
- Mesochariodes
- Paramulia
- Paranthozela
- Quebradnotia
- Tortricibaltia
- Tortricidiosis
- Tortricites
- Zerpanotia
- "Thaumatovalva"
