= Hoplitendemis =

Scientific classification
- Kingdom: Animalia
- Phylum: Arthropoda
- Class: Insecta
- Order: Lepidoptera
- Family: Tortricidae
- Tribe: Olethreutini
- Genus: Hoplitendemis; Diakonoff, 1973

Genus of tortrix moths

Hoplitendemis is a genus of moths belonging to the subfamily Olethreutinae of the family Tortricidae.

== Species ==
- Hoplitendemis centraspis Diakonoff, 1973
- Hoplitendemis erebodes Diakonoff, 1973
- Hoplitendemis inauditana Kuznetzov, 1988
- Hoplitendemis pogonopoda Diakonoff, 1973

== See also ==
- List of Tortricidae genera
