= Tritopterna =

Scientific classification
- Kingdom: Animalia
- Phylum: Arthropoda
- Class: Insecta
- Order: Lepidoptera
- Family: Tortricidae
- Subfamily: Olethreutinae
- Genus: Tritopterna; Meyrick, 1921

Genus of tortrix moths

Tritopterna is a genus of moths belonging to the subfamily Olethreutinae of the family Tortricidae.

== Species ==
- Tritopterna anachastopa (Meyrick, 1934)
- Tritopterna anastrepta (Meyrick, 1927)
- Tritopterna capyra (Meyrick, 1911)
- Tritopterna chionostoma Meyrick, 1921
- Tritopterna eocnephaea (Meyrick, 1935)
- Tritopterna galena (Meyrick, 1935)

== See also ==
- List of Tortricidae genera
