= Multiquaestia =

Scientific classification
- Kingdom: Animalia
- Phylum: Arthropoda
- Class: Insecta
- Order: Lepidoptera
- Family: Tortricidae
- Subfamily: Olethreutinae
- Genus: Multiquaestia; Karisch, 2005

Genus of tortrix moths

Multiquaestia is a genus of moths of the family Tortricidae.

== Species ==
- Multiquaestia albimaculana Karisch, 2005

== See also ==
- List of Tortricidae genera
