= Sisona =

Scientific classification
- Kingdom: Animalia
- Phylum: Arthropoda
- Class: Insecta
- Order: Lepidoptera
- Family: Tortricidae
- Tribe: Olethreutini
- Genus: Sisona; Snellen, 1902
- Species: S. albitibiana

Binomial name
- Sisona albitibiana (Snellen, 1902)

Synonyms
- Grapholoita albitibiana Snellen, 1902; Argyroploce inodes Meyrick, 1911; Argyroploce conchifera Meyrick, 1931; Sycacantha inodes perspicua Diakonoff, 1968; Sycacantha rubida Diakonoff, 1971; Sycacantha inodes celebensis Diakonoff, 1973

Monotypic genus of tortrix moths

Sisona is a genus of moths belonging to the subfamily Olethreutinae of the family Tortricidae. It contains only one species, Sisona albitibiana, which is found in south-east Asia, including Vietnam., China, Japan, Thailand, New Guinea, Borneo, Java and Sulawesi.

== Subspecies ==
There are three recognised subspecies, including:

- Sisona albitibiana albitibiana
- Sisona albitibiana rubida Diakonoff, 1971 (eastern Borneo, Thailand, Vietnam)

== See also ==
- List of Tortricidae genera
