= Laspeyresinia =

Scientific classification
- Kingdom: Animalia
- Phylum: Arthropoda
- Class: Insecta
- Order: Lepidoptera
- Family: Tortricidae
- Subfamily: Olethreutinae
- Genus: Laspeyresinia; Razowski, 1960

Genus of tortrix moths

Laspeyresinia is a genus of moths belonging to the family Tortricidae.

== Species ==
- Laspeyresinia meridaspis (Meyrick, 1922)

== See also ==
- List of Tortricidae genera
