= Zerpanotia =

Scientific classification
- Kingdom: Animalia
- Phylum: Arthropoda
- Class: Insecta
- Order: Lepidoptera
- Family: Tortricidae
- Subfamily: Olethreutinae
- Genus: Zerpanotia; Razowski & Wojtusiak, 2006

Genus of tortrix moths

Zerpanotia is a genus of moths of the family Tortricidae.

== Species ==
- Zerpanotia zerpana Razowski & Wojtusiak, 2006

== See also ==
- List of Tortricidae genera
