= Bubonoxena =

Scientific classification
- Kingdom: Animalia
- Phylum: Arthropoda
- Class: Insecta
- Order: Lepidoptera
- Family: Tortricidae
- Subfamily: Olethreutinae
- Genus: Bubonoxena; Diakonoff, 1968

Type species
- Bubonoxena spirographa Diakonoff, 1968

Genus of tortrix moths

Bubonoxena is a genus of moths belonging to the subfamily Olethreutinae of the family Tortricidae.

== Species ==
- Bubonoxena alatheta Razowski & Trematerra, 2010 (Ethiopia)
- Bubonoxena spirographa Diakonoff, 1968 (Philippines)

== See also ==
- List of Tortricidae genera
