= Agriophanes =

Scientific classification
- Kingdom: Animalia
- Phylum: Arthropoda
- Class: Insecta
- Order: Lepidoptera
- Family: Tortricidae
- Subfamily: Olethreutinae
- Genus: Agriophanes; Meyrick, 1930

Genus of tortrix moths

Agriophanes is a genus of moths belonging to the subfamily Olethreutinae of the family Tortricidae, with a single species found in India.

== Species ==
- Agriophanes pycnostrota Meyrick, 1930

== See also ==
- List of Tortricidae genera
