= Karacaoglania =

Scientific classification
- Kingdom: Animalia
- Phylum: Arthropoda
- Class: Insecta
- Order: Lepidoptera
- Family: Tortricidae
- Subfamily: Olethreutinae
- Genus: Karacaoglania; Kocak, 1981

Genus of tortrix moths

Karacaoglania is a genus of moths belonging to the subfamily Olethreutinae of the family Tortricidae.

== Species ==
- Karacaoglania xerophila (Meyrick, 1939)

== See also ==
- List of Tortricidae genera
