= Afrothreutes =

Scientific classification
- Kingdom: Animalia
- Phylum: Arthropoda
- Class: Insecta
- Order: Lepidoptera
- Family: Tortricidae
- Tribe: Olethreutini
- Genus: Afrothreutes; Aarvik, 2004

Genus of tortrix moths

Afrothreutes is a genus of moths belonging to the subfamily Olethreutinae of the family Tortricidae.

== Species ==
- Afrothreutes larnacidia
- Afrothreutes madoffei Aarvik, 2004
- Afrothreutes nigeriana

== See also ==
- List of Tortricidae genera
