= Rhodotoxotis =

Scientific classification
- Kingdom: Animalia
- Phylum: Arthropoda
- Class: Insecta
- Order: Lepidoptera
- Family: Tortricidae
- Subfamily: Olethreutinae
- Genus: Rhodotoxotis; Diakonoff, 1992

Genus of tortrix moths

Rhodotoxotis is a genus of moths belonging to the subfamily Olethreutinae of the family Tortricidae.

== Species ==
- Rhodotoxotis arciferana (Mabille, 1900)
- Rhodotoxotis heteromorpha Diakonoff, 1992
- Rhodotoxotis phylochrysa Diakonoff, 1992
- Rhodotoxotis plutostola Diakonoff, 1992

== See also ==
- List of Tortricidae genera
