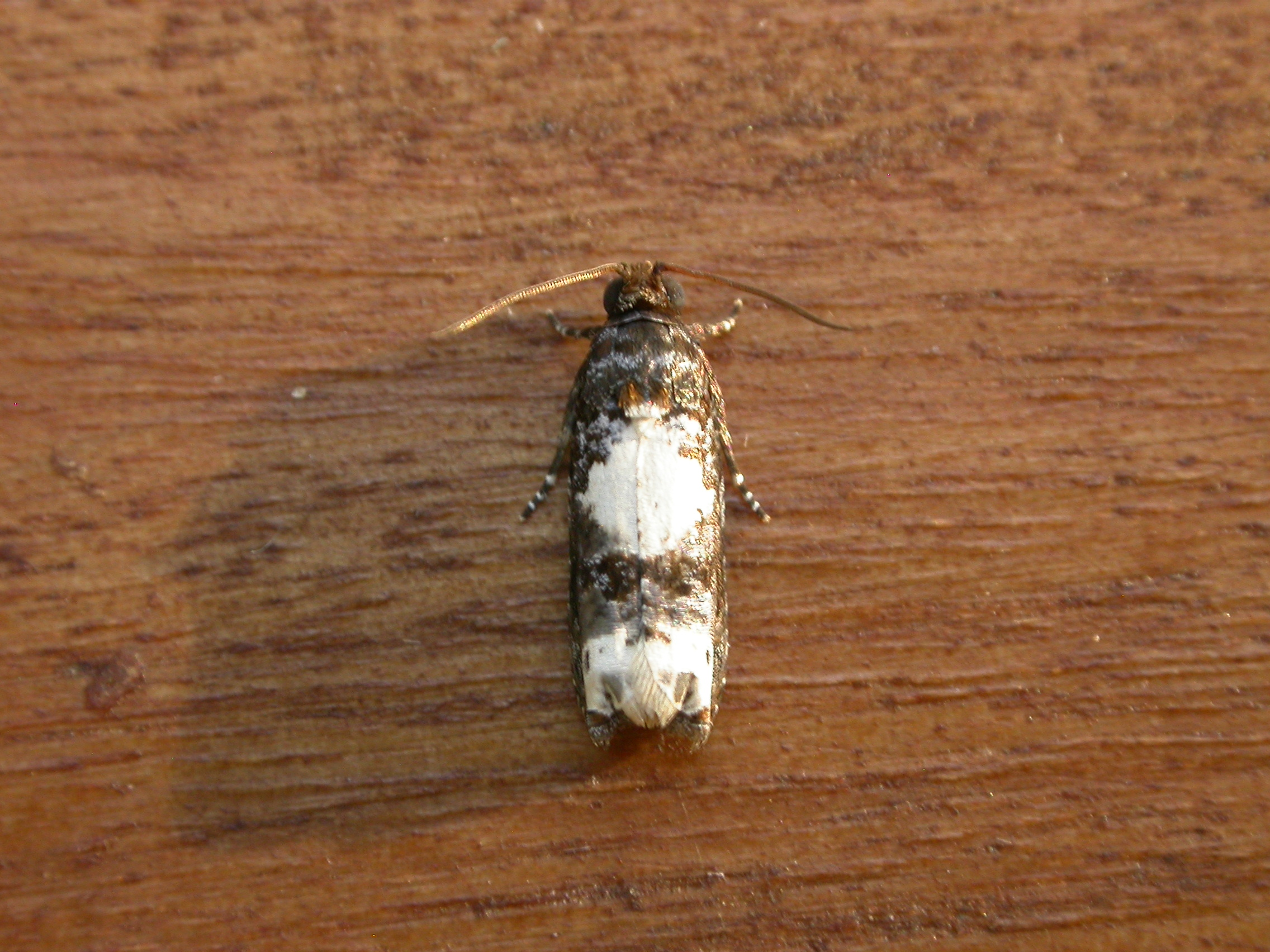

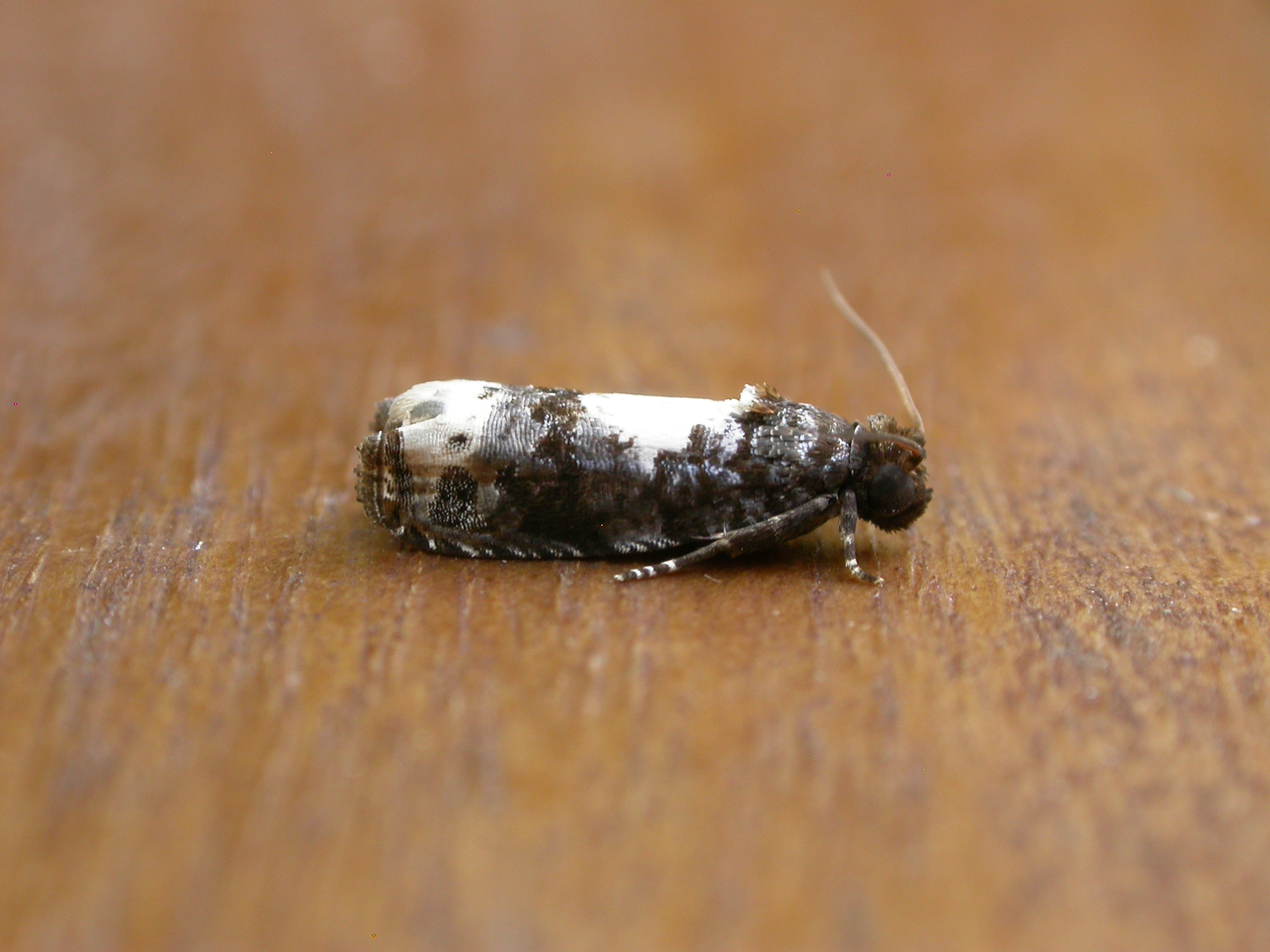

Scientific classification
- Kingdom: Animalia
- Phylum: Arthropoda
- Class: Insecta
- Order: Lepidoptera
- Family: Tortricidae
- Tribe: Olethreutini
- Genus: Euobraztsovia; Diakonoff, 1966
- Species: E. chionodelta

Binomial name
- Euobraztsovia chionodelta (Meyrick, 1911)

Synonyms
- Argyroploce chionodelta Meyrick, 1911

= Euobraztsovia =

Genus of tortrix moths

Euobraztsovia is a genus of moths belonging to the subfamily Olethreutinae of the family Tortricidae. It contains only one species, Euobraztsovia chionodelta, which is found in Queensland, the Bismarck Islands, the D'Entrecasteaux Islands and western New Guinea.

The wingspan is 13–16 mm.

== See also ==
- List of Tortricidae genera
