= Niphadostola =

Scientific classification
- Kingdom: Animalia
- Phylum: Arthropoda
- Class: Insecta
- Order: Lepidoptera
- Family: Tortricidae
- Subfamily: Olethreutinae
- Genus: Niphadostola; Diakonoff, 1989

Genus of tortrix moths

Niphadostola is a genus of moths belonging to the family Tortricidae.

== Species ==
- Niphadostola asceta Diakonoff, 1989
- Niphadostola chionea Diakonoff, 1989
- Niphadostola crocosema Diakonoff, 1989

== See also ==
- List of Tortricidae genera
