= Phalarocarpa =

Scientific classification
- Kingdom: Animalia
- Phylum: Arthropoda
- Class: Insecta
- Order: Lepidoptera
- Family: Tortricidae
- Subfamily: Olethreutinae
- Genus: Phalarocarpa

Genus of tortrix moths

Phalarocarpa is a genus of moths belonging to the subfamily Olethreutinae of the family Tortricidae.

== Species ==
- Phalarocarpa harmographa Meyrick, 1937
- Phalarocarpa ioxanthas Meyrick, 1930

== See also ==
- List of Tortricidae genera
