= Basigonia =

Scientific classification
- Kingdom: Animalia
- Phylum: Arthropoda
- Class: Insecta
- Order: Lepidoptera
- Family: Tortricidae
- Tribe: Olethreutini
- Genus: Basigonia; Diakonoff, 1983

Genus of tortrix moths

Basigonia is a genus of moths belonging to the subfamily Olethreutinae of the family Tortricidae.

== Species ==
- Basigonia anisoscia Diakonoff, 1983

== See also ==
- List of Tortricidae genera
