= Theorica (moth) =

Scientific classification
- Domain: Eukaryota
- Kingdom: Animalia
- Phylum: Arthropoda
- Class: Insecta
- Order: Lepidoptera
- Family: Tortricidae
- Subfamily: Olethreutinae
- Tribe: Olethreutini
- Genus: Theorica; Diakonoff, 1966

Genus of tortrix moths

Theorica is a genus of leafroller moths in the family Tortricidae. There are at least four described species in Theorica.

== Species ==
These species belong to the genus Theorica:

- Theorica lamyra (Meyrick, 1911) (New Guinea)
- Theorica malnadense Reddy & Shashank, 2023 (India)
- Theorica secunda Kuznetzov, 1997 (Vietnam )
- Theorica valuliae Pinkaew & Muadsub, 2019 (Thailand)

== See also ==
- List of Tortricidae genera
