= Apeleptera =

Scientific classification
- Kingdom: Animalia
- Phylum: Arthropoda
- Class: Insecta
- Order: Lepidoptera
- Family: Tortricidae
- Subfamily: Olethreutinae
- Genus: Apeleptera

Monotypic genus of tortrix moths

Apeleptera is a genus of moths belonging to the subfamily Olethreutinae of the family Tortricidae.

It has a single species, Apeleptera semnodryas, found in Taiwan by Edward Meyrick in 1926.

== See also ==
- List of Tortricidae genera
