= Muhabbetina =

Scientific classification
- Kingdom: Animalia
- Phylum: Arthropoda
- Class: Insecta
- Order: Lepidoptera
- Family: Tortricidae
- Subfamily: Olethreutinae
- Genus: Muhabbetina; Koçak, 2006

Synonyms
- Mesotes Diakonoff, 1988

Genus of tortrix moths

Muhabbetina is a genus of moths of the family Tortricidae.

== Species ==
- Muhabbetina chromataspis (Meyrick, 1913)
- Muhabbetina pectinata (Diakonoff, 1988)
- Muhabbetina psimythistes (Diakonoff, 1988)

== See also ==
- List of Tortricidae genera
