= Cryptoschesis =

Scientific classification
- Kingdom: Animalia
- Phylum: Arthropoda
- Class: Insecta
- Order: Lepidoptera
- Family: Tortricidae
- Subfamily: Olethreutinae
- Genus: Cryptoschesis; Diakonoff, 1988

Genus of tortrix moths

Cryptoschesis is a genus of moths belonging to the family Tortricidae.

== Species ==
- Cryptoschesis imitans Diakonoff, 1988

== See also ==
- List of Tortricidae genera
