= Dracontogena =

Scientific classification
- Kingdom: Animalia
- Phylum: Arthropoda
- Class: Insecta
- Order: Lepidoptera
- Family: Tortricidae
- Subfamily: Olethreutinae
- Genus: Dracontogena; Diakonoff, 1970

Genus of tortrix moths

Dracontogena is a genus of moths belonging to the subfamily Olethreutinae of the family Tortricidae.

== Species ==
- Dracontogena bernardi Karisch, 2005
- Dracontogena hoppei Karisch, 2005
- Dracontogena lucki Karisch, 2005
- Dracontogena metamorphica (Meyrick, 1928)
- Dracontogena niphadonta Diakonoff, 1970
- Dracontogena schnirchi Karisch, 2005
- Dracontogena tonitrualis (Meyrick, 1934)

== See also ==
- List of Tortricidae genera
