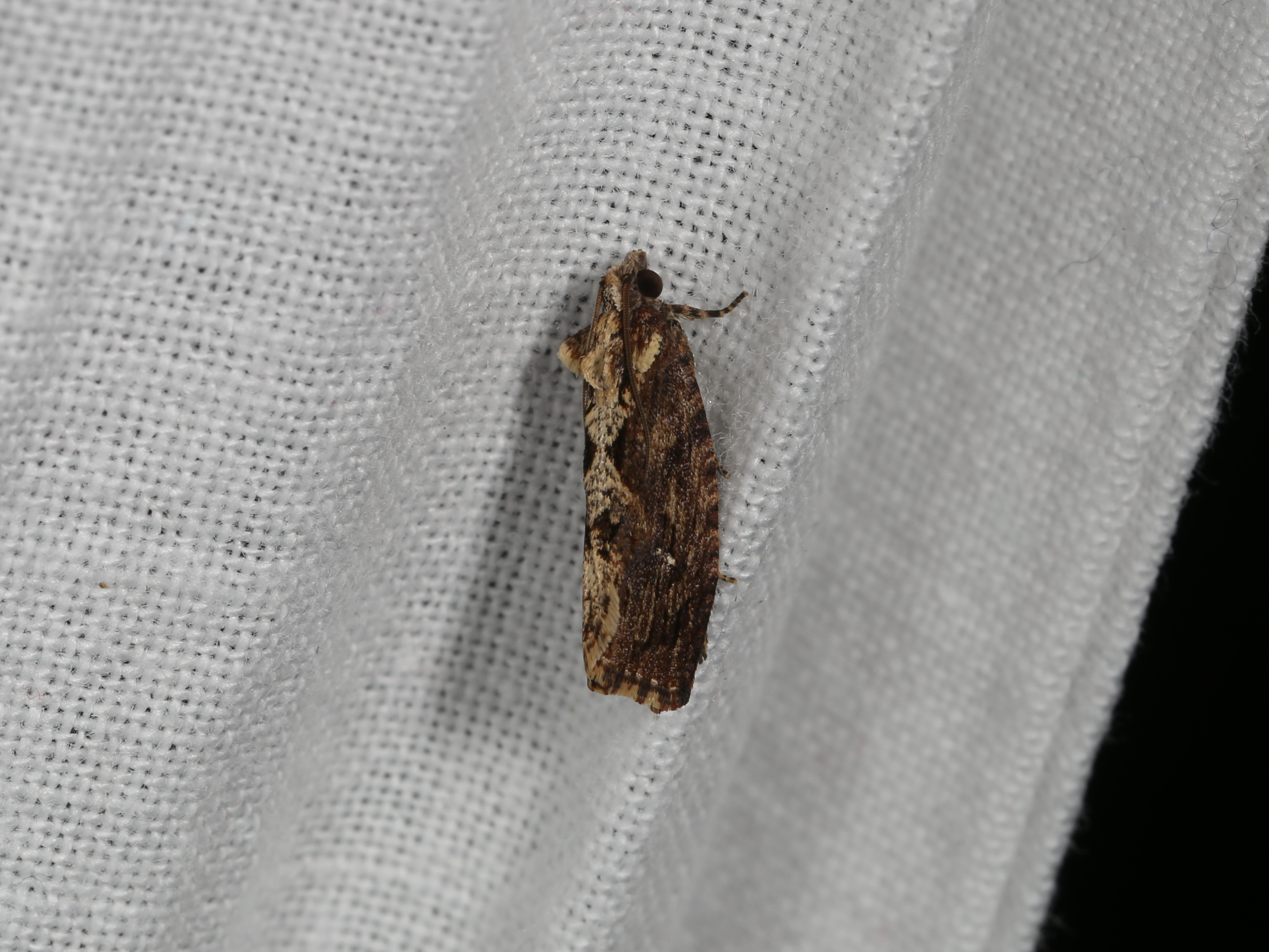
- Oxysemaphora notialis

Scientific classification
- Kingdom: Animalia
- Phylum: Arthropoda
- Class: Insecta
- Order: Lepidoptera
- Family: Tortricidae
- Subfamily: Olethreutinae
- Genus: Oxysemaphora; Diakonoff, 1973

= Oxysemaphora =

Genus of tortrix moths

Oxysemaphora is a genus of moths belonging to the subfamily Olethreutinae of the family Tortricidae.

== Species ==
- Oxysemaphora chionolitha (Meyrick, 1938)
- Oxysemaphora hacobiani Horak, 2006
- Oxysemaphora notialis Horak, 2006

== See also ==
- List of Tortricidae genera
