= Afrocostosa =

Scientific classification
- Kingdom: Animalia
- Phylum: Arthropoda
- Class: Insecta
- Order: Lepidoptera
- Family: Tortricidae
- Subfamily: Olethreutinae
- Genus: Afrocostosa; Aarvik, 2004

Genus of tortrix moths

Afrocostosa is a genus of moths belonging to the subfamily Tortricinae of the family Tortricidae, with a single species.

== Species ==
- Afrocostosa flaviapicella Aarvik, 2004

== See also ==
- List of Tortricidae genera
