= Hetereucosma =

Scientific classification
- Kingdom: Animalia
- Phylum: Arthropoda
- Class: Insecta
- Order: Lepidoptera
- Family: Tortricidae
- Tribe: Eucosmini
- Genus: Hetereucosma; Zhang & Li, 2006

Genus of tortrix moths

Hetereucosma is a genus of moths of the family Tortricidae.

== Species ==
- Hetereucosma fasciaria Zhang & Li, 2006
- Hetereucosma fuscusiptera Zhang & Li, 2006
- Hetereucosma rectangula Zhang & Li, 2006
- Hetereucosma trapezia Zhang & Li, 2006

== See also ==
- List of Tortricidae genera
