= Eudemopsis =

Scientific classification
- Kingdom: Animalia
- Phylum: Arthropoda
- Class: Insecta
- Order: Lepidoptera
- Family: Tortricidae
- Subfamily: Olethreutinae
- Genus: Eudemopsis; Falkovitsh, 1962

Genus of tortrix moths

Eudemopsis is a genus of moths belonging to the subfamily Olethreutinae of the family Tortricidae.

== Species ==
- Eudemopsis albopunctata Liu & Bai, 1982
- Eudemopsis brevis Liu & Bai, 1982
- Eudemopsis flexis Liu & Bai, 1982
- Eudemopsis heteroclita Liu & Bai, 1982
- Eudemopsis kirishimensis Kawabe, 1974
- Eudemopsis polytrichia Liu & Bai, 1985
- Eudemopsis pompholycias (Meyrick, in Caradja & Meyrick, 1935)
- Eudemopsis purpurissatana (Kennel, 1901)
- Eudemopsis ramiformis Liu & Bai, 1982
- Eudemopsis tokui Kawabe, 1974
- Eudemopsis toshimai Kawabe, 1974

== See also ==
- List of Tortricidae genera
