= Astronauta =

Scientific classification
- Kingdom: Animalia
- Phylum: Arthropoda
- Class: Insecta
- Order: Lepidoptera
- Family: Tortricidae
- Subfamily: Olethreutinae
- Genus: Astronauta; Diakonoff, 1983

Genus of tortrix moths

Astronauta is a genus of moths belonging to the subfamily Olethreutinae of the family Tortricidae.

== Species ==
- Astronauta astrogenes (Meyrick, 1934)
- Astronauta cassiterastra (Meyrick, 1931)
- Astronauta gnophera Razowski, 2015
- Astronauta sinastra Razowski & Wojtusiak, 2012
- Astronauta stellans (Meyrick, 1922)

== See also ==
- List of Tortricidae genera
