= Lipsotelus =

Scientific classification
- Kingdom: Animalia
- Phylum: Arthropoda
- Class: Insecta
- Order: Lepidoptera
- Family: Tortricidae
- Subfamily: Olethreutinae
- Genus: Lipsotelus; Walsingham, 1900

Genus of tortrix moths

Lipsotelus is a genus of moths belonging to the subfamily Olethreutinae of the family Tortricidae.

== Species ==
- Lipsotelus anacanthus Diakonoff, 1973
- Lipsotelus armiger Diakonoff, 1973
- Lipsotelus lichenoides Walsingham, in Walsingham & Durrant, in Swinhoe, 1900
- Lipsotelus xyloides Diakonoff, 1973

== See also ==
- List of Tortricidae genera
