= Hilaroptila =

Scientific classification
- Kingdom: Animalia
- Phylum: Arthropoda
- Class: Insecta
- Order: Lepidoptera
- Family: Tortricidae
- Subfamily: Olethreutinae
- Genus: Hilaroptila; Diakonoff, 1970

Genus of tortrix moths

Hilaroptila is a genus of moths belonging to the subfamily Olethreutinae of the family Tortricidae.

== Species ==
- Hilaroptila mimetica Diakonoff, 1970

== See also ==
- List of Tortricidae genera
