= Apsidophora =

Scientific classification
- Domain: Eukaryota
- Kingdom: Animalia
- Phylum: Arthropoda
- Class: Insecta
- Order: Lepidoptera
- Family: Tortricidae
- Subfamily: Olethreutinae
- Genus: Apsidophora; Diakonoff, 1973
- Species: A. purpurorbis

Binomial name
- Apsidophora purpurorbis Diakonoff, 1973

Monotypic genus of tortrix moths

Apsidophora is a genus of moths belonging to the subfamily Olethreutinae of the family Tortricidae. It contains only one species, Apsidophora purpurorbis, which is found in Thailand, the Malay Peninsula, Sumatra and New Guinea.

== See also ==
- List of Tortricidae genera
