= Cacocharis =

Scientific classification
- Kingdom: Animalia
- Phylum: Arthropoda
- Clade: Pancrustacea
- Class: Insecta
- Order: Lepidoptera
- Family: Tortricidae
- Subfamily: Olethreutinae
- Genus: Cacocharis; Walsingham, 1892

Genus of tortrix moths

Cacocharis is a genus of moths belonging to the subfamily Olethreutinae of the family Tortricidae.

== Species ==
- Cacocharis albimacula Walsingham, 1892
- Cacocharis canofascia (Forbes, 1930)
- Cacocharis cymotoma (Meyrick, 1917)

== See also ==
- List of Tortricidae genera
