= Mesochariodes =

Scientific classification
- Kingdom: Animalia
- Phylum: Arthropoda
- Class: Insecta
- Order: Lepidoptera
- Family: Tortricidae
- Tribe: Eucosmini
- Genus: Mesochariodes; Razowski & Wojtusiak, 2006

Genus of tortrix moths

Mesochariodes is a genus of moths of the family Tortricidae.

== Species ==
- Mesochariodes armifera Razowski & Becker, 2015
- Mesochariodes micropollex Razowski & Wojtusiak, 2008
- Mesochariodes obrimospina Razowski & Becker, 2015
- Mesochariodes ochyrosetaria Razowski & Becker, 2015
- Mesochariodes polytrichta Razowski & Wojtusiak, 2006
- Mesochariodes tablonica Razowski & Wojtusiak, 2009

== See also ==
- List of Tortricidae genera
