= Rhodocosmaria =

Scientific classification
- Kingdom: Animalia
- Phylum: Arthropoda
- Class: Insecta
- Order: Lepidoptera
- Family: Tortricidae
- Subfamily: Olethreutinae
- Genus: Rhodocosmaria; Diakonoff, 1973

Genus of tortrix moths

Rhodocosmaria is a genus of moths belonging to the subfamily Olethreutinae of the family Tortricidae.

== Species ==
- Rhodocosmaria occidentalis Diakonoff, 1973
- Rhodocosmaria operosa (Meyrick, 1911)

== See also ==
- List of Tortricidae genera
