= Ahmosia =

Scientific classification
- Kingdom: Animalia
- Phylum: Arthropoda
- Class: Insecta
- Order: Lepidoptera
- Family: Tortricidae
- Subfamily: Olethreutinae
- Genus: Ahmosia; Heinrich, 1926

Genus of tortrix moths

Ahmosia is a genus of moths belonging to the subfamily Olethreutinae of the family Tortricidae.

== Species ==
- Ahmosia aspasiana (McDunnough, 1922)
- Ahmosia galbinea Heinrich, 1926

== See also ==
- List of Tortricidae genera
