= Orientophiaris =

Scientific classification
- Kingdom: Animalia
- Phylum: Arthropoda
- Class: Insecta
- Order: Lepidoptera
- Family: Tortricidae
- Subfamily: Olethreutinae
- Genus: Orientophiaris; Kuznetzov, 2001

Genus of tortrix moths

Orientophiaris is a genus of moths belonging to the family Tortricidae.

== Species ==
- Orientophiaris altissima (Kawabe, 1978)

== See also ==
- List of Tortricidae genera
