= Podognatha =

Scientific classification
- Kingdom: Animalia
- Phylum: Arthropoda
- Class: Insecta
- Order: Lepidoptera
- Family: Tortricidae
- Subfamily: Olethreutinae
- Genus: Podognatha; Diakonoff, 1966

Genus of tortrix moths

Podognatha is a genus of moths belonging to the subfamily Olethreutinae of the family Tortricidae.

== Species ==
- Podognatha opulenta (Diakonoff, 1973)
- Podognatha rebellis (Meyrick, 1931)
- Podognatha tamias Diakonoff, 1966
- Podognatha vinculata (Meyrick, 1916)

== See also ==
- List of Tortricidae genera
