= Rhopaltriplasia =

Scientific classification
- Kingdom: Animalia
- Phylum: Arthropoda
- Class: Insecta
- Order: Lepidoptera
- Family: Tortricidae
- Subfamily: Olethreutinae
- Genus: Rhopaltriplasia; Diakonoff, 1973

Genus of tortrix moths

Rhopaltriplasia is a genus of moths belonging to the subfamily Olethreutinae of the family Tortricidae.

== Species ==
- Rhopaltriplasia anamilleta Diakonoff, 1973
- Rhopaltriplasia insignata Kuznetzov, 1997
- Rhopaltriplasia macrorhis Diakonoff, 1983
- Rhopaltriplasia spinalis Yu & Li, 2005
- Rhopaltriplasia trimelaena (Meyrick, 1922)

== See also ==
- List of Tortricidae genera
