= Actinocentra =

Scientific classification
- Kingdom: Animalia
- Phylum: Arthropoda
- Clade: Pancrustacea
- Class: Insecta
- Order: Lepidoptera
- Family: Tortricidae
- Subfamily: Olethreutinae
- Genus: Actinocentra; Diakonoff, 1973

Genus of tortrix moths

Actinocentra is a monotypic genus of moths belonging to the subfamily Olethreutinae of the family Tortricidae. It contains only one species, Actinocentra aliena, described by Diakonoff in 1973.

== See also ==
- List of Tortricidae genera
