= Dynatorhabda =

Scientific classification
- Kingdom: Animalia
- Phylum: Arthropoda
- Class: Insecta
- Order: Lepidoptera
- Family: Tortricidae
- Subfamily: Olethreutinae
- Genus: Dynatorhabda; Diakonoff, 1973

Genus of tortrix moths

Dynatorhabda is a genus of moths belonging to the family Tortricidae.

== Species ==
- Dynatorhabda cremnocrates (Meyrick, 1932)

== See also ==
- List of Tortricidae genera
