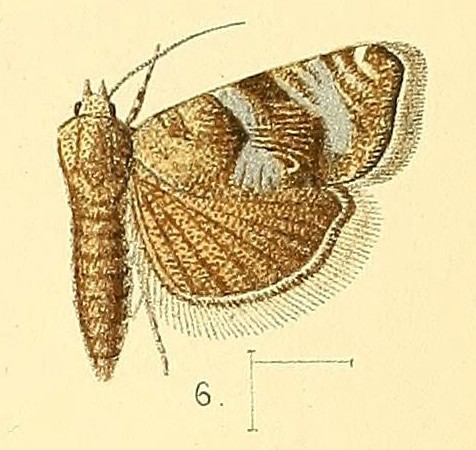
- Coccothera spissana

Scientific classification
- Kingdom: Animalia
- Phylum: Arthropoda
- Clade: Pancrustacea
- Class: Insecta
- Order: Lepidoptera
- Family: Tortricidae
- Subfamily: Olethreutinae
- Genus: Coccothera; Meyrick, 1914

Type species
- Coccothera spissana (Zeller, 1852)

= Coccothera =

Genus of tortrix moths

Coccothera is a genus of moths belonging to the subfamily Olethreutinae of the family Tortricidae.

== Species ==
- Coccothera albolineana Larsen, 2023
- Coccothera areata (Meyrick, 1918)
- Coccothera bvumbana Larsen, 2023
- Coccothera carolae Razowski & Trematerra, 2010
- Coccothera cipollana Larsen, 2023
- Coccothera cyaneana (Agassiz, 2014)
- Coccothera cyphospila (Meyrick, 1920)
- Coccothera kingstoni Larsen, 2023
- Coccothera nicomacha (Meyrick, 1921)
- Coccothera quadropunctana Larsen, 2023
- Coccothera spissana (Zeller, 1852)*
- Coccothera triorbis Razowski & Trematerra, 2010

(*Including synonyms C. ferrifracta, C. pharaonana, C. victrix).

== See also ==
- List of Tortricidae genera
