= Stenentoma =

Scientific classification
- Kingdom: Animalia
- Phylum: Arthropoda
- Class: Insecta
- Order: Lepidoptera
- Family: Tortricidae
- Subfamily: Olethreutinae
- Genus: Stenentoma; Diakonoff, 1969

Genus of tortrix moths

Stenentoma is a genus of moths belonging to the subfamily Olethreutinae of the family Tortricidae.

== Species ==
- Stenentoma chrysolampra Diakonoff, 1969
- Stenentoma onychosema Diakonoff, 1969

== See also ==
- List of Tortricidae genera
