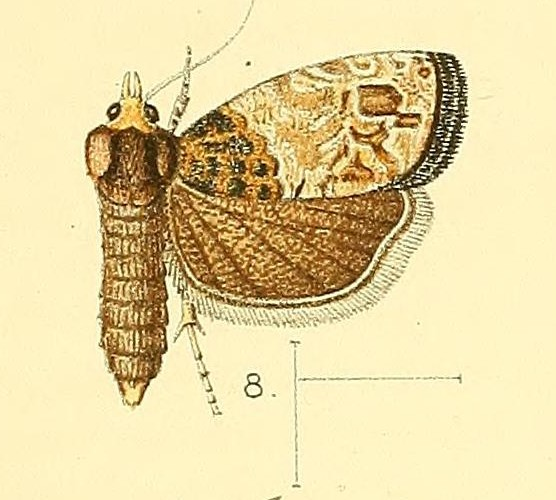
- Neaspasia brevibasana

Scientific classification
- Domain: Eukaryota
- Kingdom: Animalia
- Phylum: Arthropoda
- Class: Insecta
- Order: Lepidoptera
- Family: Tortricidae
- Tribe: Enarmoniini
- Genus: Neaspasia; Diakonoff, 1989

Synonyms
- Genetancylis (Razowski, 1995)

= Neaspasia =

Genus of tortrix moths

Neaspasia is a genus of moths belonging to the family Tortricidae.

== Species ==
- Neaspasia brevibasana (Walsingham, 1891)
- Neaspasia brevisecta (Meyrick, 1930)
- Neaspasia coronana Aarvik, 2014
- Neaspasia homalota (Razowski, 1995)
- Neaspasia karischi Aarvik, 2014
- Neaspasia loxochlamys Diakonoff, 1989
- Neaspasia malamigambo Aarvik, 2014
- Neaspasia orthacta (Meyrick, 1908)

== See also ==
- List of Tortricidae genera
