= Statherotmantis =

Scientific classification
- Kingdom: Animalia
- Phylum: Arthropoda
- Class: Insecta
- Order: Lepidoptera
- Family: Tortricidae
- Subfamily: Olethreutinae
- Genus: Statherotmantis; Diakonoff, 1973

Genus of tortrix moths

Statherotmantis is a genus of moths belonging to the family Tortricidae.

== Species ==
- Statherotmantis laetana Kuznetzov, 1988
- Statherotmantis peregrina (Falkovitsh, 1966)
- Statherotmantis pictana (Kuznetzov, 1969)
- Statherotmantis shicotana (Kuznetzov, 1969)

== See also ==
- List of Tortricidae genera
