= Pseudohedya =

Scientific classification
- Kingdom: Animalia
- Phylum: Arthropoda
- Class: Insecta
- Order: Lepidoptera
- Family: Tortricidae
- Subfamily: Olethreutinae
- Genus: Pseudohedya; Falkovitsh, 1962

Genus of tortrix moths

Pseudohedya is a genus of moths belonging to the subfamily Olethreutinae of the family Tortricidae.

== Species ==
- Pseudohedya cincinna Falkovitsh, 1962
- Pseudohedya dentata Oku, 2005
- Pseudohedya fanjinica Yu & Li, 2006
- Pseudohedya gradana (Christoph, 1882)
- Pseudohedya liui Yu & Li, 2006
- Pseudohedya plumbosana (Kawabe, 1972)
- Pseudohedya retracta Falkovitsh, 1962
- Pseudohedya satoi Kawabe, 1978

== See also ==
- List of Tortricidae genera
