= Eubrochoneura =

Scientific classification
- Kingdom: Animalia
- Phylum: Arthropoda
- Class: Insecta
- Order: Lepidoptera
- Family: Tortricidae
- Subfamily: Olethreutinae
- Genus: Eubrochoneura; Diakonoff, 1966

Genus of tortrix moths

Eubrochoneura is a genus of moths belonging to the subfamily Olethreutinae of the family Tortricidae.

== Species ==
- Eubrochoneura aversa Diakonoff, 1973
- Eubrochoneura frustulosa (Diakonoff, 1973)
- Eubrochoneura parasema (Meyrick, 1911)

== See also ==
- List of Tortricidae genera
