= Paraeccopsis =

Scientific classification
- Kingdom: Animalia
- Phylum: Arthropoda
- Class: Insecta
- Order: Lepidoptera
- Family: Tortricidae
- Subfamily: Olethreutinae
- Genus: Paraeccopsis; Aarvik, 2004

Genus of tortrix moths

Paraeccopsis is a genus of moths belonging to the family Tortricidae.

== Species ==
- Paraeccopsis insellata Meyrick, 1920

== See also ==
- List of Tortricidae genera
