= Geita (moth) =

Scientific classification
- Domain: Eukaryota
- Kingdom: Animalia
- Phylum: Arthropoda
- Class: Insecta
- Order: Lepidoptera
- Family: Tortricidae
- Tribe: Olethreutini
- Genus: Geita; Aarvik, 2004

Genus of tortrix moths

Geita is a genus of moths belonging to the family Tortricidae.

== Species ==
- Geita bjoernstadi Aarvik, 2004

== See also ==
- List of Tortricidae genera
