= Baburia =

Scientific classification
- Kingdom: Animalia
- Phylum: Arthropoda
- Class: Insecta
- Order: Lepidoptera
- Family: Tortricidae
- Subfamily: Olethreutinae
- Genus: Baburia; Koçak, 1981

Genus of tortrix moths

Baburia is a genus of moths belonging to family Tortricidae.

== Species ==
- Baburia abdita (Diakonoff, 1973)
- Baburia paucustriga (Jirasuttayaporn and Pinkaew, 2018)
- Baburia trachymelas (Diakonoff, 1973)

== See also ==
- List of Tortricidae genera
