= Lepidunca =

Scientific classification
- Kingdom: Animalia
- Phylum: Arthropoda
- Class: Insecta
- Order: Lepidoptera
- Family: Tortricidae
- Subfamily: Olethreutinae
- Genus: Lepidunca; Diakonoff, 1984

Genus of tortrix moths

Lepidunca is a genus of moths belonging to the subfamily Olethreutinae of the family Tortricidae.

== Species ==
- Lepidunca empidomorpha Diakonoff, 1984

== See also ==
- List of Tortricidae genera
