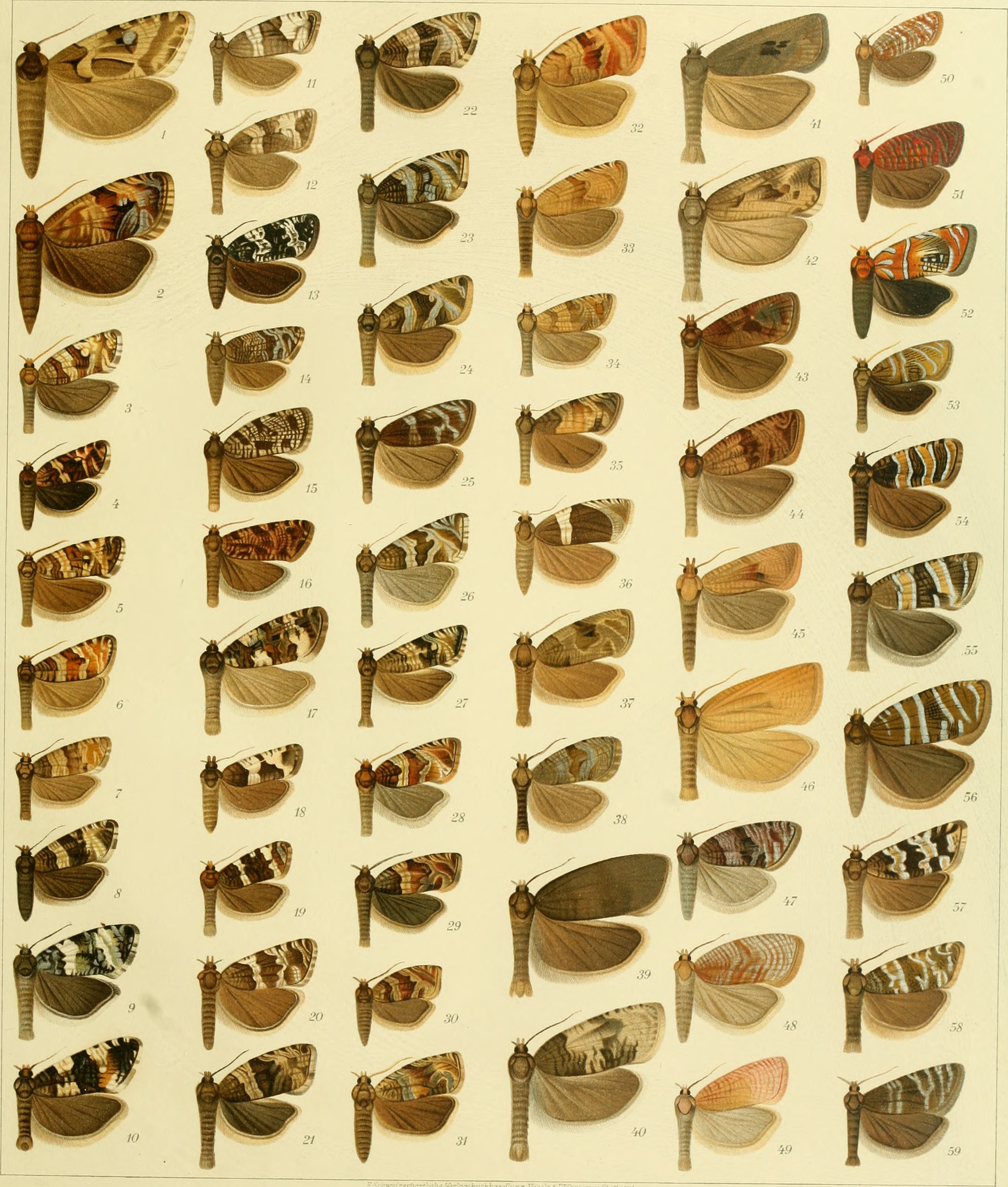
- Rudisociaria expeditana in Kennel Die palaearktischen tortriciden, male figure 20

Scientific classification
- Kingdom: Animalia
- Phylum: Arthropoda
- Class: Insecta
- Order: Lepidoptera
- Family: Tortricidae
- Subfamily: Olethreutinae
- Genus: Rudisociaria; Falkovitsh, 1962

= Rudisociaria =

Genus of tortrix moths

Rudisociaria is a genus of moths belonging to the family Tortricidae.

== Species ==
- Rudisociaria expeditana (Snellen, 1883)
- Rudisociaria velutinum (Walsingham, 1900)

== See also ==
- List of Tortricidae genera
