= Atrypsiastis =

Scientific classification
- Kingdom: Animalia
- Phylum: Arthropoda
- Class: Insecta
- Order: Lepidoptera
- Family: Tortricidae
- Subfamily: Olethreutinae
- Genus: Atrypsiastis; Meyrick, 1932

Genus of tortrix moths

Atrypsiastis is a genus of moths belonging to the subfamily Olethreutinae of the family Tortricidae.

== Species ==
- Atrypsiastis salva Meyrick, in Caradja, 1932

== See also ==
- List of Tortricidae genera
