= Antirrhopa =

Scientific classification
- Kingdom: Animalia
- Phylum: Arthropoda
- Class: Insecta
- Order: Lepidoptera
- Family: Tortricidae
- Subfamily: Olethreutinae
- Genus: Antirrhopa; Diakonoff, 1973

Genus of tortrix moths

Antirrhopa is a genus of moths belonging to the subfamily Olethreutinae of the family Tortricidae.

== Species ==
- Antirrhopa glyceranthes (Meyrick, 1928)
- Antirrhopa grammateus Diakonoff, 1973
- Antirrhopa orthopa Diakonoff, 1973

== See also ==
- List of Tortricidae genera
