= Hopliteccopsis =

Scientific classification
- Kingdom: Animalia
- Phylum: Arthropoda
- Class: Insecta
- Order: Lepidoptera
- Family: Tortricidae
- Subfamily: Olethreutinae
- Genus: Hopliteccopsis; Diakonoff, 1963

Genus of tortrix moths

Hopliteccopsis is a genus of moths belonging to the subfamily Olethreutinae of the family Tortricidae.

== Species ==
- Hopliteccopsis amemorpha Diakonoff, 1963
- Hopliteccopsis crocostoma Diakonoff, 1992
- Hopliteccopsis maura Diakonoff, 1983

== See also ==
- List of Tortricidae genera
