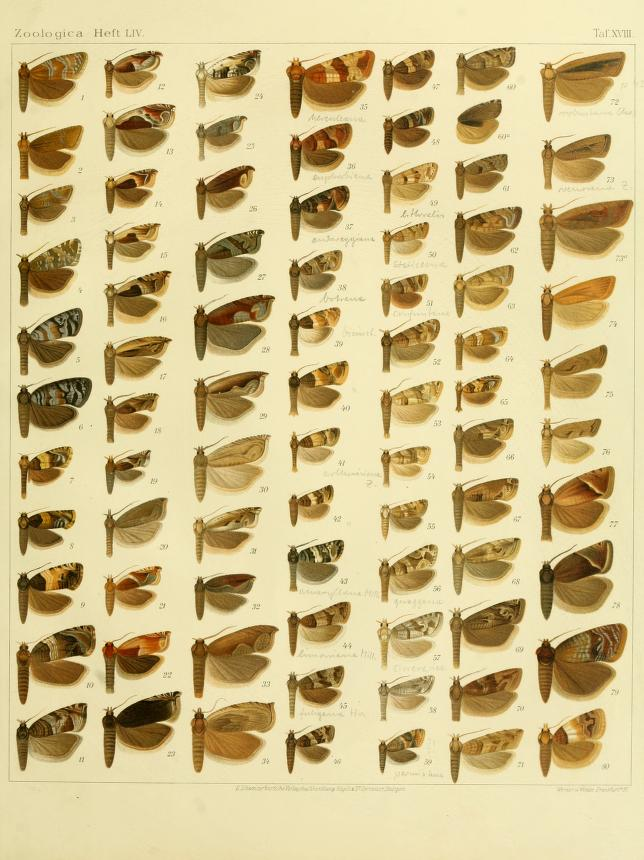
- Lobesiodes euphorbiana in Kennel Die palaearktischen tortriciden figure 36 female

Scientific classification
- Kingdom: Animalia
- Phylum: Arthropoda
- Class: Insecta
- Order: Lepidoptera
- Family: Tortricidae
- Subfamily: Olethreutinae
- Genus: Lobesiodes; Diakonoff, 1954

= Lobesiodes =

Genus of tortrix moths

Lobesiodes is a genus of moths belonging to the family Tortricidae.

== Species ==
- Lobesiodes euphorbiana (Freyer, 1842)
- Lobesiodes occidentis (Falkovitsh, 1970)

== See also ==
- List of Tortricidae genera
