= Socioplana =

Scientific classification
- Kingdom: Animalia
- Phylum: Arthropoda
- Class: Insecta
- Order: Lepidoptera
- Family: Tortricidae
- Subfamily: Olethreutinae
- Genus: Socioplana; Diakonoff, 1983

Genus of tortrix moths

Socioplana is a genus of moths belonging to the family Tortricidae.

== Species ==
- Socioplana idicopoda Diakonoff, 1983

== See also ==
- List of Tortricidae genera
