= Mesocharis =

Scientific classification
- Kingdom: Animalia
- Phylum: Arthropoda
- Class: Insecta
- Order: Lepidoptera
- Family: Tortricidae
- Subfamily: Olethreutinae
- Genus: Mesocharis; Diakonoff, 1981

Genus of tortrix moths

Mesocharis is a genus of moths belonging to the family Tortricidae.

== Species ==
- Mesocharis centrifuga Diakonoff, 1981

== See also ==
- List of Tortricidae genera
