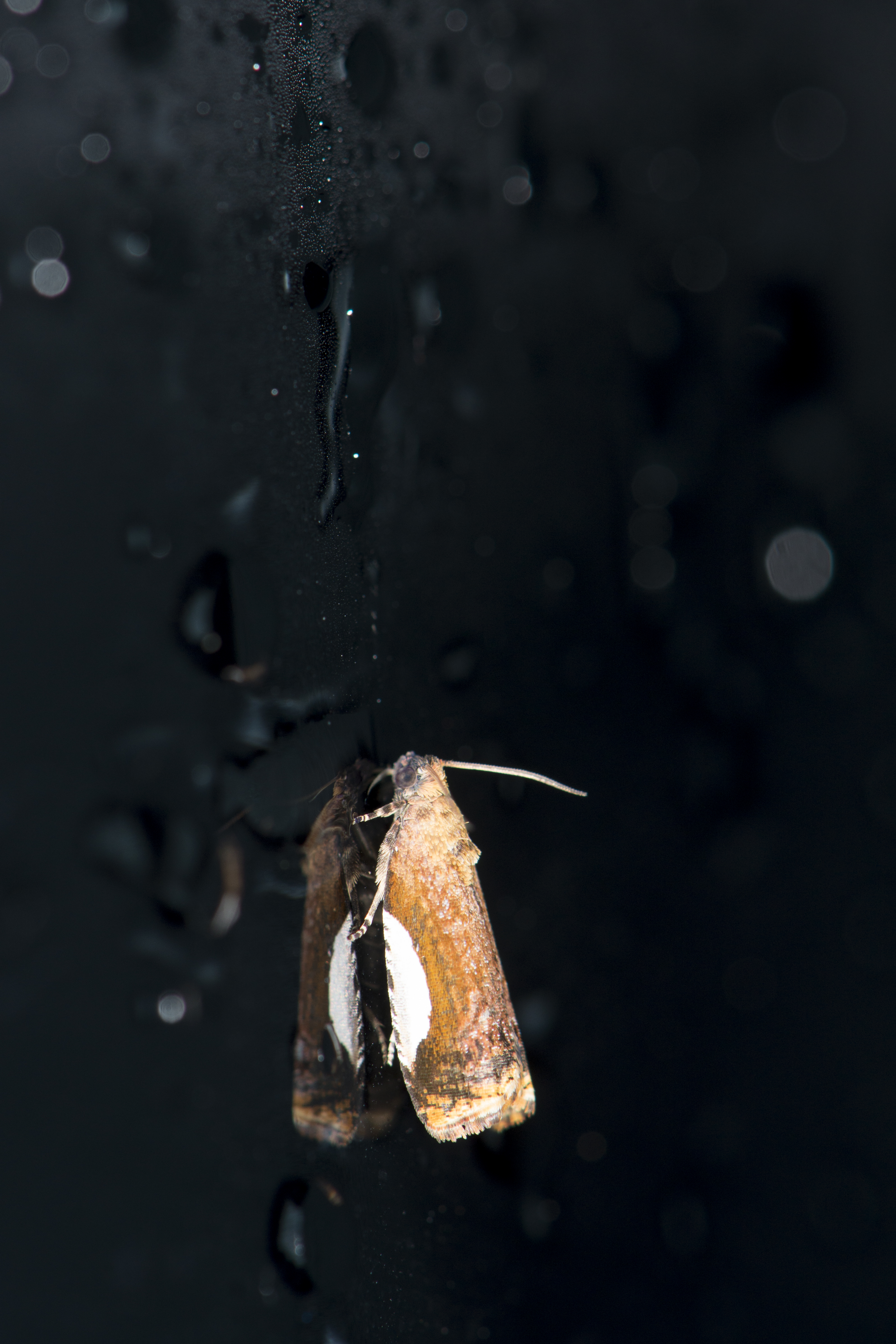

Scientific classification
- Kingdom: Animalia
- Phylum: Arthropoda
- Class: Insecta
- Order: Lepidoptera
- Family: Tortricidae
- Subfamily: Olethreutinae
- Genus: Statherotoxys; Diakonoff, 1973

= Statherotoxys =

Genus of tortrix moths

Statherotoxys is a genus of moths belonging to the subfamily Olethreutinae of the family Tortricidae.

== Species ==
- Statherotoxys acrorhaga Diakonoff, 1973
- Statherotoxys eurydelta Diakonoff, 1973
- Statherotoxys hedraea (Meyrick, 1905)
- Statherotoxys hypochrysa Diakonoff, 1973
- Statherotoxys niphophora Diakonoff, 1973
- Statherotoxys pudica Diakonoff, 1973

== See also ==
- List of Tortricidae genera
