= Cephalophyes =

Scientific classification
- Kingdom: Animalia
- Phylum: Arthropoda
- Class: Insecta
- Order: Lepidoptera
- Family: Tortricidae
- Subfamily: Olethreutinae
- Genus: Cephalophyes; Diakonoff, 1973

Genus of tortrix moths

Cephalophyes is a genus of moths belonging to the subfamily Olethreutinae of the family Tortricidae.

== Species ==
- Cephalophyes cyanura (Meyrick, 1909)
- Cephalophyes latens (Diakonoff, 1973)
- Cephalophyes porphyrea Diakonoff, 1973

== See also ==
- List of Tortricidae genera
