= Alexiloga =

Scientific classification
- Kingdom: Animalia
- Phylum: Arthropoda
- Class: Insecta
- Order: Lepidoptera
- Family: Tortricidae
- Subfamily: Olethreutinae
- Genus: Alexiloga; Meyrick, 1922

Genus of tortrix moths

Alexiloga is a genus of moths belonging to the subfamily Tortricinae of the family Tortricidae.

== Species ==
- Alexiloga defluxana
- Alexiloga rubiginosana (Walker, 1863)

== See also ==
- List of Tortricidae genera
