= Synnoma =

Scientific classification
- Domain: Eukaryota
- Kingdom: Animalia
- Phylum: Arthropoda
- Class: Insecta
- Order: Lepidoptera
- Family: Tortricidae
- Subfamily: Tortricinae
- Genus: Synnoma; Walsingham, 1879
- Species: S. lynosyrana

Binomial name
- Synnoma lynosyrana Walsingham, 1879

Synonyms
- Synnoma linosyrana Meyrick, in Wagner, 1912

Monotypic genus of tortrix moths

Synnoma is a genus of moths belonging to the subfamily Tortricinae of the family Tortricidae. It contains only one species, the rabbitbrush webbing moth (Synnoma lynosyrana), which is found in North America, including Arizona.

The wingspan is 14–21 mm.

== See also ==
- List of Tortricidae genera

== Gallery ==
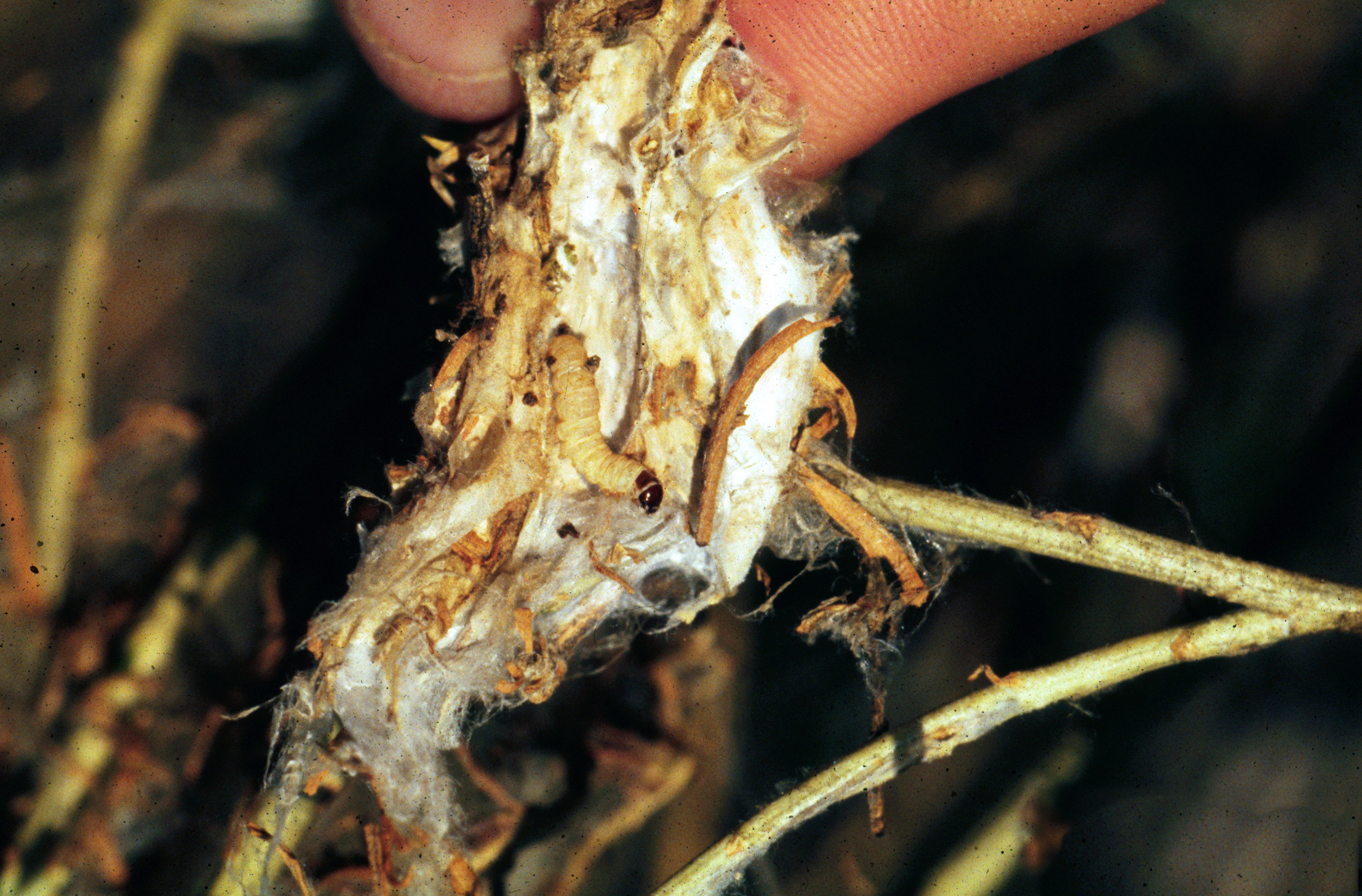
Larvae

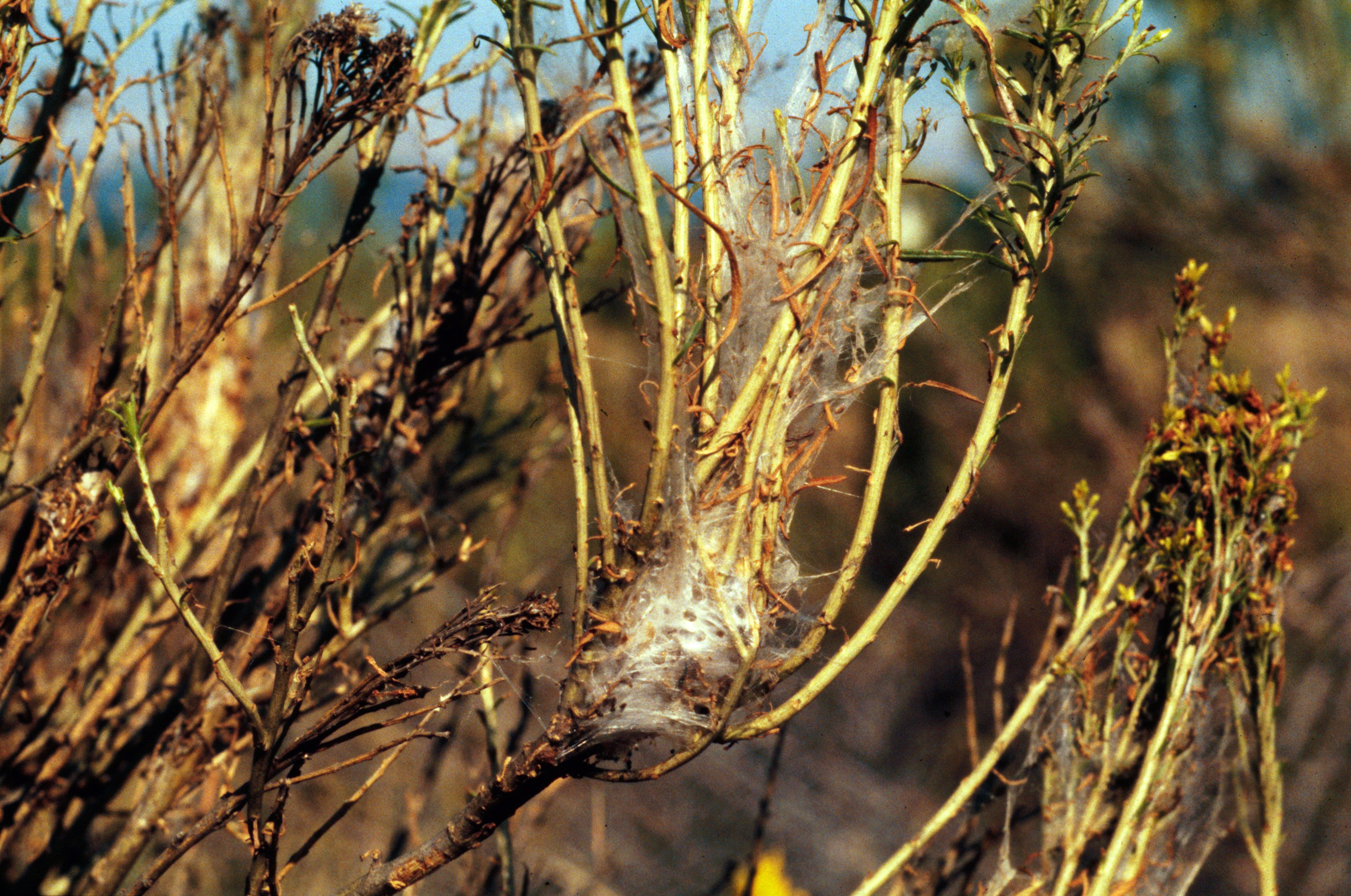
Tent
