= Megalomacha =

Scientific classification
- Kingdom: Animalia
- Phylum: Arthropoda
- Class: Insecta
- Order: Lepidoptera
- Family: Tortricidae
- Subfamily: Olethreutinae
- Genus: Megalomacha; Diakonoff, 1960

Genus of tortrix moths

Megalomacha is a genus of moths belonging to the subfamily Tortricinae of the family Tortricidae.

== Species ==
- Megalomacha tigripes Diakonoff, 1960

== See also ==
- List of Tortricidae genera
