= Apolobesia =

Scientific classification
- Kingdom: Animalia
- Phylum: Arthropoda
- Class: Insecta
- Order: Lepidoptera
- Family: Tortricidae
- Subfamily: Olethreutinae
- Genus: Apolobesia; Diakonoff, 1954

Genus of tortrix moths

Apolobesia is a genus of moths belonging to family Tortricidae.

== Species ==
- Apolobesia nsukka
- Apolobesia sitophaga (Meyrick, 1922)

== See also ==
- List of Tortricidae genera
