= Nepheloploce =

Scientific classification
- Kingdom: Animalia
- Phylum: Arthropoda
- Class: Insecta
- Order: Lepidoptera
- Family: Tortricidae
- Tribe: Olethreutini
- Genus: Nepheloploce; Razowski, 2010
- Species: N. nephelopyrga

Binomial name
- Nepheloploce nephelopyrga (Meyrick, 1938)

Synonyms
- Argyroploce nephelopyrga Meyrick, 1938

Genus of moths

Nepheloploce is a genus of moths of the family Tortricidae. It contains only one species, Nepheloploce nephelopyrga, which is found in the Democratic Republic of the Congo.
