= Trachyschistis =

Scientific classification
- Kingdom: Animalia
- Phylum: Arthropoda
- Class: Insecta
- Order: Lepidoptera
- Family: Tortricidae
- Subfamily: Olethreutinae
- Genus: Trachyschistis; Meyrick, 1921

Genus of tortrix moths

Trachyschistis is a genus of moths belonging to the subfamily Olethreutinae of the family Tortricidae.

== Species ==
- Trachyschistis hians Meyrick, 1921

== See also ==
- List of Tortricidae genera
