= Syncratus =

Scientific classification
- Kingdom: Animalia
- Phylum: Arthropoda
- Class: Insecta
- Order: Lepidoptera
- Family: Tortricidae
- Subfamily: Tortricinae
- Genus: Syncratus; Common, 1965

Genus of tortrix moths

Syncratus is a genus of moths belonging to the subfamily Tortricinae of the family Tortricidae.

== Species ==
- Syncratus paroecus Common, 1965
- Syncratus scepanus Common, 1965

== See also ==
- List of Tortricidae genera
