= Rhopalotenes =

Scientific classification
- Kingdom: Animalia
- Phylum: Arthropoda
- Class: Insecta
- Order: Lepidoptera
- Family: Tortricidae
- Subfamily: Tortricinae
- Genus: Rhopalotenes; Diakonoff, 1960

Genus of tortrix moths

Rhopalotenes is a genus of moths belonging to the subfamily Tortricinae of the family Tortricidae.

== Species ==
- Rhopalotenes argyrolemma (Diakonoff, 1954)
- Rhopalotenes halirrhothia (Meyrick, 1938)
- Rhopalotenes irresoluta (Diakonoff, 1954)
- Rhopalotenes platyptila (Diakonoff, 1954)

== See also ==
- List of Tortricidae genera
