= Oligotenes =

Scientific classification
- Kingdom: Animalia
- Phylum: Arthropoda
- Class: Insecta
- Order: Lepidoptera
- Family: Tortricidae
- Subfamily: Tortricinae
- Genus: Oligotenes; Diakonoff, 1954

Genus of tortrix moths

Oligotenes is a genus of moths belonging to the subfamily Tortricinae of the family Tortricidae.

== Species ==
- Oligotenes amblygrapha Diakonoff, 1973
- Oligotenes antistita Diakonoff, 1974
- Oligotenes chrysoteuches Diakonoff, 1954
- Oligotenes hierophantis (Diakonoff, 1954)
- Oligotenes polylampes Diakonoff, 1954

== See also ==
- List of Tortricidae genera
