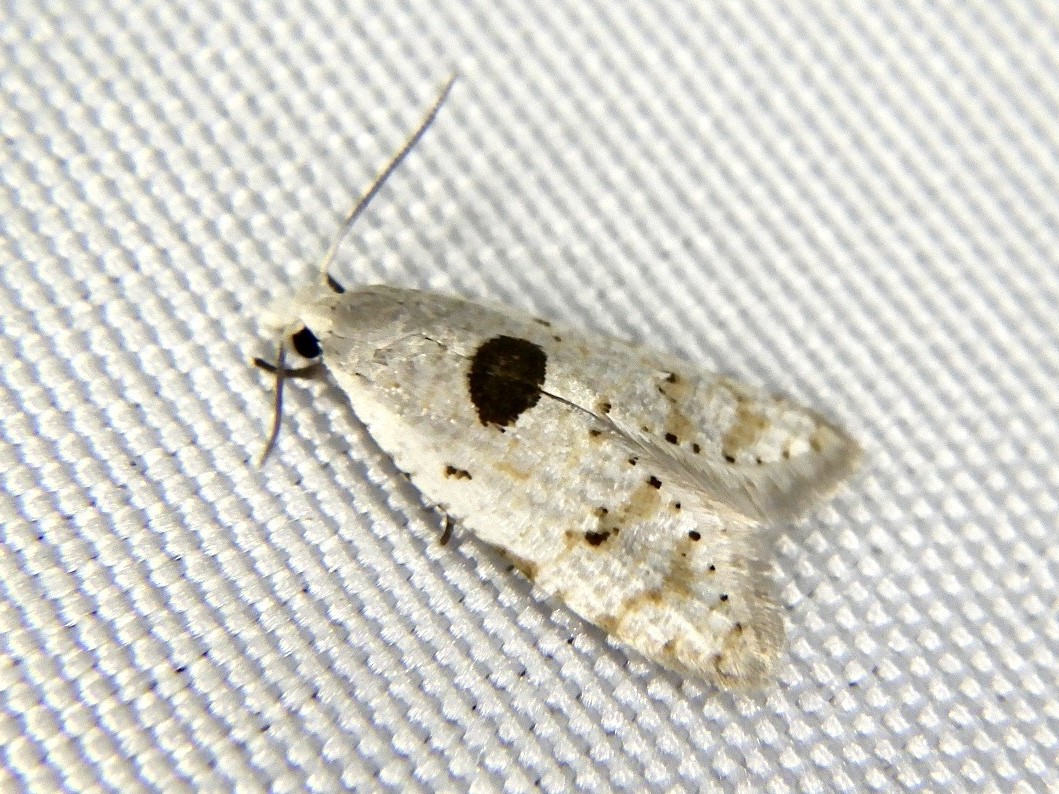
- Homalernis fluctuosa

Scientific classification
- Kingdom: Animalia
- Phylum: Arthropoda
- Class: Insecta
- Order: Lepidoptera
- Family: Tortricidae
- Subfamily: Tortricinae
- Genus: Homalernis; Meyrick, 1908

= Homalernis =

Genus of tortrix moths

Homalernis is a genus of moths belonging to the subfamily Tortricinae of the family Tortricidae.

== Species ==
The following species are recognised in the genus Homalernis:

- Homalernis arystis Meyrick, 1918
- Homalernis jeriau Razowski, 2012
- Homalernis mankoboi Razowski, 2012
- Homalernis semaphora Meyrick, 1908

== See also ==
- List of Tortricidae genera
