= Barygnathella =

Scientific classification
- Kingdom: Animalia
- Phylum: Arthropoda
- Class: Insecta
- Order: Lepidoptera
- Family: Tortricidae
- Subfamily: Tortricinae
- Genus: Barygnathella; Diakonoff, 1956

Genus of tortrix moths

Barygnathella is a genus of moths belonging to the subfamily Tortricinae of the family Tortricidae.

== Species ==
- Barygnathella acrogonia (Diakonoff, 1954)
- Barygnathella anthracospila (Diakonoff, 1954)
- Barygnathella argentea (Diakonoff, 1954)
- Barygnathella bathyglypha (Diakonoff, 1951)
- Barygnathella caryotrota (Meyrick, 1938)
- Barygnathella centripeta Diakonoff, 1973
- Barygnathella chrysauges (Diakonoff, 1954)
- Barygnathella diagrapha Diakonoff, 1973
- Barygnathella glaucops (Diakonoff, 1954)
- Barygnathella lithodes (Diakonoff, 1954)
- Barygnathella olivacea (Diakonoff, 1954)
- Barygnathella ophiodora (Diakonoff, 1954)
- Barygnathella orphnina (Diakonoff, 1954)
- Barygnathella phanerosema Diakonoff, 1972
- Barygnathella plagiozona Diakonoff, 1972
- Barygnathella polystalagma (Diakonoff, 1954)
- Barygnathella prosecta Diakonoff, 1972
- Barygnathella psorospora Diakonoff, 1973
- Barygnathella pulverulosa Diakonoff, 1972
- Barygnathella rhodantha (Diakonoff, 1954)
- Barygnathella seriographa Diakonoff, 1974
- Barygnathella subtilis (Diakonoff, 1954)
- Barygnathella teratographa (Diakonoff, 1954)
- Barygnathella triangulum (Diakonoff, 1954)
- Barygnathella tricolor (Diakonoff, 1944)
- Barygnathella virens (Diakonoff, 1954)

== See also ==
- List of Tortricidae genera
