= Neotenes =

Scientific classification
- Kingdom: Animalia
- Phylum: Arthropoda
- Class: Insecta
- Order: Lepidoptera
- Family: Tortricidae
- Subfamily: Tortricinae
- Genus: Neotenes; Diakonoff, 1960

Genus of tortrix moths

Neotenes is a genus of moths belonging to the family Tortricidae.

== Species ==
- Neotenes astromontana Diakonoff, 1972
- Neotenes canescens (Diakonoff, 1954)

== See also ==
- List of Tortricidae genera
