= Antigraptis =

Scientific classification
- Kingdom: Animalia
- Phylum: Arthropoda
- Class: Insecta
- Order: Lepidoptera
- Family: Tortricidae
- Subfamily: Tortricinae
- Genus: Antigraptis; Meyrick, 1930

Genus of tortrix moths

Antigraptis is a genus of moths belonging to the subfamily Tortricinae of the family Tortricidae.

== Species ==
- Antigraptis hemicrates Meyrick, 1930
- Antigraptis trigonia Zhang & Li, 2004

== See also ==
- List of Tortricidae genera
