= Choristenes =

Scientific classification
- Kingdom: Animalia
- Phylum: Arthropoda
- Class: Insecta
- Order: Lepidoptera
- Family: Tortricidae
- Subfamily: Tortricinae
- Genus: Choristenes; Diakonoff, 1954

Genus of tortrix moths

Choristenes is a genus of moths belonging to the subfamily Tortricinae of the family Tortricidae.

== Species ==
- Choristenes melitoptila (Meyrick, 1938)

== See also ==
- List of Tortricidae genera
