= Archactenis =

Scientific classification
- Kingdom: Animalia
- Phylum: Arthropoda
- Class: Insecta
- Order: Lepidoptera
- Family: Tortricidae
- Subfamily: Tortricinae
- Genus: Archactenis; Diakonoff, 1960

Genus of tortrix moths

Archactenis is a genus of moths belonging to the subfamily Tortricinae of the family Tortricidae.

== Species ==
- Archactenis centrostricta (Diakonoff, 1941)
- Archactenis haplozona (Meyrick, 1921)

== See also ==
- List of Tortricidae genera
