= Protarchella =

Scientific classification
- Kingdom: Animalia
- Phylum: Arthropoda
- Class: Insecta
- Order: Lepidoptera
- Family: Tortricidae
- Subfamily: Tortricinae
- Genus: Protarchella; Diakonoff, 1956

Genus of tortrix moths

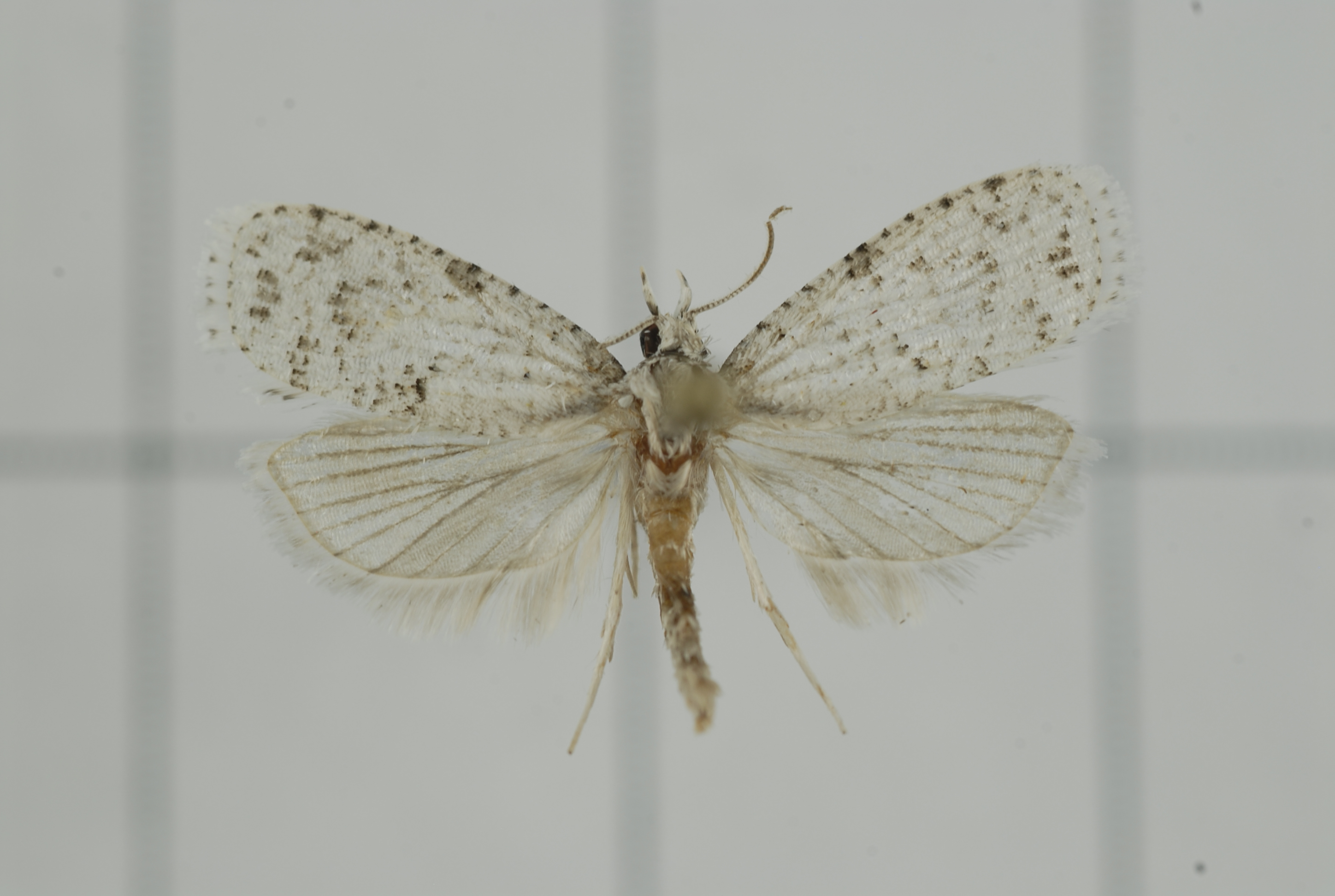
Protarchella nivis, Tortricidae

Protarchella is a genus of moths belonging to the subfamily Tortricinae of the family Tortricidae.

== Species ==
- Protarchella acheensis Diakonoff, 1983
- Protarchella antirrhopa Diakonoff, 1956
- Protarchella atalohypha Diakonoff, 1974
- Protarchella bebaea Diakonoff, 1974
- Protarchella centrophracta (Meyrick, 1924)
- Protarchella chalcotypa (Diakonoff, 1954)
- Protarchella conioplegma (Diakonoff, 1954)
- Protarchella cyclopa Diakonoff, 1956
- Protarchella euschema Diakonoff, 1974
- Protarchella exarthra (Meyrick, 1918)
- Protarchella leptomorpha (Diakonoff, 1954)
- Protarchella lyssodes (Meyrick, 1910)
- Protarchella meesi Diakonoff, 1960
- Protarchella nivis (Diakonoff, 1941)
- Protarchella paraptera (Meyrick, 1910)
- Protarchella torquens Diakonoff, 1960
- Protarchella xenographa (Diakonoff, 1954)

== See also ==
- List of Tortricidae genera
