= Proactenis =

Scientific classification
- Kingdom: Animalia
- Phylum: Arthropoda
- Class: Insecta
- Order: Lepidoptera
- Family: Tortricidae
- Subfamily: Tortricinae
- Genus: Proactenis; Diakonoff, 1941

Genus of tortrix moths

Proactenis is a genus of moths belonging to the subfamily Tortricinae of the family Tortricidae.

== Species ==
- Proactenis leucocharis (Meyrick, 1933)
- Proactenis sisir Diakonoff, 1941
- Proactenis tricomma Diakonoff, 1941
- Proactenis uniata Diakonoff, 1960

== See also ==
- List of Tortricidae genera
