= Rhabdotenes =

Scientific classification
- Kingdom: Animalia
- Phylum: Arthropoda
- Class: Insecta
- Order: Lepidoptera
- Family: Tortricidae
- Subfamily: Tortricinae
- Genus: Rhabdotenes; Diakonoff, 1960

Genus of tortrix moths

Rhabdotenes is a genus of moths belonging to the subfamily Tortricinae of the family Tortricidae.

== Species ==
- Rhabdotenes anthracobathra (Meyrick, 1938)
- Rhabdotenes arachnodes (Diakonoff, 1944)
- Rhabdotenes cylicophora (Diakonoff, 1954)
- Rhabdotenes dacryta Diakonoff, 1974
- Rhabdotenes dicentropa Diakonoff, 1972
- Rhabdotenes mesotrauma (Diakonoff, 1954)
- Rhabdotenes octosticta (Meyrick, 1930)
- Rhabdotenes operosa (Diakonoff, 1954)
- Rhabdotenes pachydesma (Diakonoff, 1954)
- Rhabdotenes phloeotis (Diakonoff, 1954)
- Rhabdotenes semisericea Diakonoff, 1960
- Rhabdotenes subcroceata (Meyrick, 1938)
- Rhabdotenes velutina (Diakonoff, 1954)
- Rhabdotenes vinki Diakonoff, 1972

== See also ==
- List of Tortricidae genera
