= Nesoscopa =

Scientific classification
- Kingdom: Animalia
- Phylum: Arthropoda
- Class: Insecta
- Order: Lepidoptera
- Family: Tortricidae
- Subfamily: Tortricinae
- Genus: Nesoscopa; Meyrick, 1926

Genus of tortrix moths

Nesoscopa is a genus of moths belonging to the subfamily Tortricinae of the family Tortricidae.

== Species ==
- Nesoscopa exsors Meyrick, 1926
- Nesoscopa psarodes Bradley, 1962

== See also ==
- List of Tortricidae genera
