= Proselena =

Scientific classification
- Kingdom: Animalia
- Phylum: Arthropoda
- Class: Insecta
- Order: Lepidoptera
- Family: Tortricidae
- Subfamily: Tortricinae
- Genus: Proselena; Meyrick, 1881

Genus of tortrix moths

Proselena is a genus of moths belonging to the subfamily Tortricinae of the family Tortricidae.

== Species ==
- Proselena annosana Meyrick, 1881
- Proselena tenella (Meyrick, 1910)
- Proselena thamnas (Meyrick, 1910)

== See also ==
- List of Tortricidae genera
