= Campotenes =

Scientific classification
- Kingdom: Animalia
- Phylum: Arthropoda
- Class: Insecta
- Order: Lepidoptera
- Family: Tortricidae
- Subfamily: Tortricinae
- Genus: Campotenes; Diakonoff, 1960

Genus of tortrix moths

Campotenes is a genus of moths belonging to the subfamily Tortricinae of the family Tortricidae.

== Species ==
- Campotenes beryllodes (Diakonoff, 1954)
- Campotenes chrysopluta (Diakonoff, 1954)
- Campotenes microphthalma (Diakonoff, 1954)
- Campotenes vervoorti Diakonoff, 1972

== See also ==
- List of Tortricidae genera
