= Saetotenes =

Scientific classification
- Kingdom: Animalia
- Phylum: Arthropoda
- Class: Insecta
- Order: Lepidoptera
- Family: Tortricidae
- Subfamily: Tortricinae
- Genus: Saetotenes; Diakonoff, 1960

Genus of tortrix moths

Saetotenes is a genus of moths belonging to the family Tortricidae.

== Species ==
- Saetotenes anguina Diakonoff, 1973
- Saetotenes atresta Diakonoff, 1972
- Saetotenes deterior Diakonoff, 1974
- Saetotenes dimorpha (Diakonoff, 1954)
- Saetotenes farinata (Diakonoff, 1954)
- Saetotenes infuscata (Diakonoff, 1954)
- Saetotenes latenota (Diakonoff, 1954)
- Saetotenes megalops (Diakonoff, 1954)
- Saetotenes metagrapha (Diakonoff, 1954)
- Saetotenes ornithotypa (Meyrick, 1938)
- Saetotenes rubiginosa (Diakonoff, 1954)
- Saetotenes sitochroma (Diakonoff, 1954)

== See also ==
- List of Tortricidae genera
