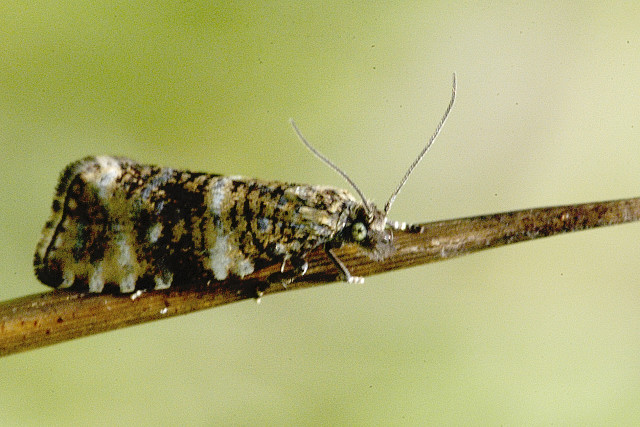
- Syricoris lacunana

Scientific classification
- Kingdom: Animalia
- Phylum: Arthropoda
- Class: Insecta
- Order: Lepidoptera
- Family: Tortricidae
- Subfamily: Olethreutinae; Walsingham, 1895

Tribes
- Bactrini; Enarmoniini; Endotheniini; Eucosmini; Gatesclarkeanini; Grapholitini; Microcorsini; Olethreutini

= Olethreutinae =

Subfamily of moths

Olethreutinae is a subfamily of moths in the family Tortricidae.

== Genera incertae sedis ==
This tortricine genus has not been assigned to a tribe yet:

Melanalopha

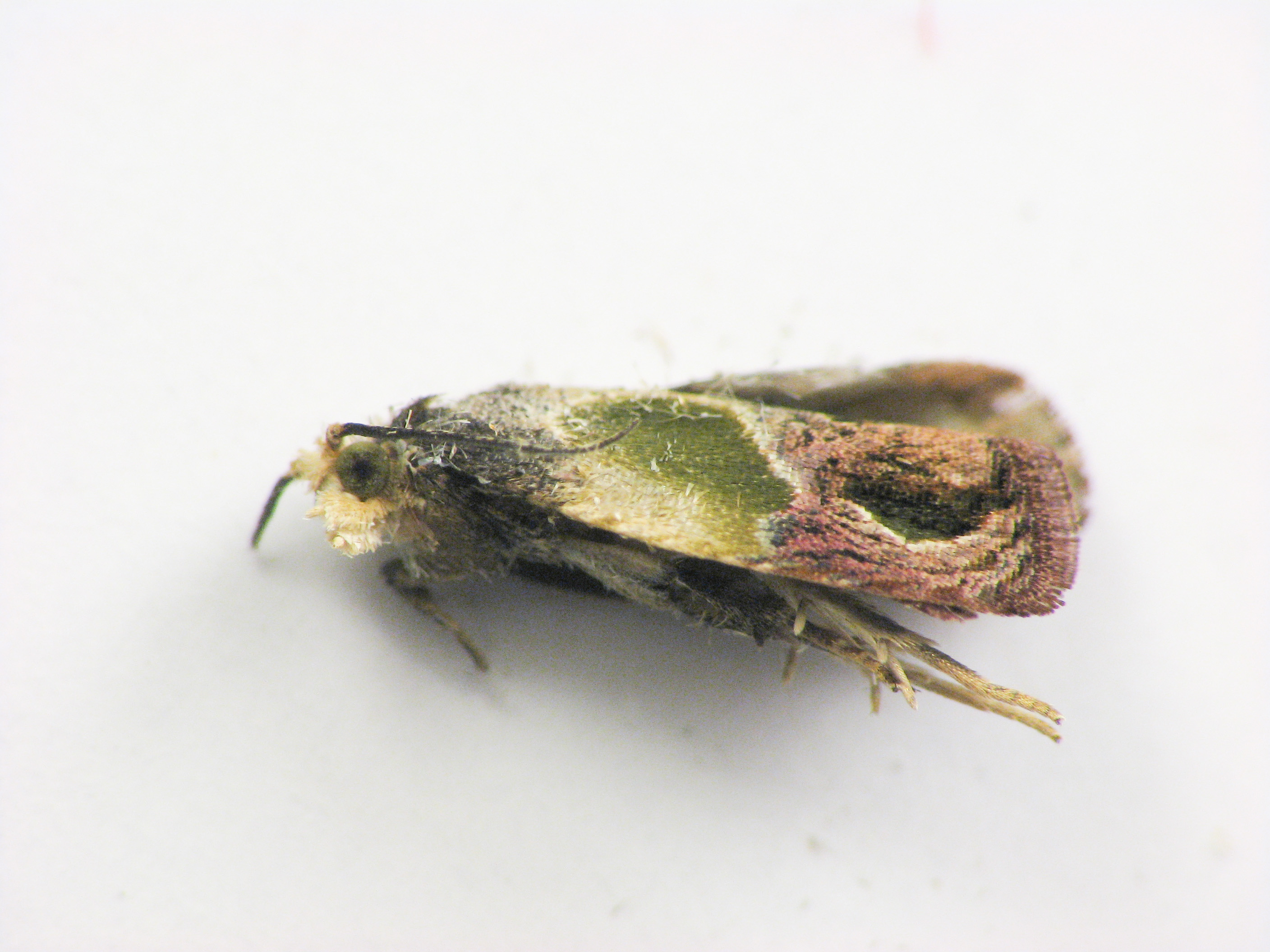
Eumarozia malachitana
