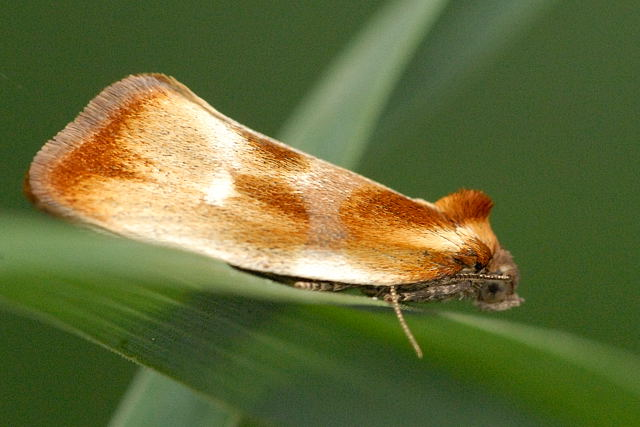

Scientific classification
- Kingdom: Animalia
- Phylum: Arthropoda
- Class: Insecta
- Order: Lepidoptera
- Family: Tortricidae
- Subfamily: Tortricinae
- Tribe: Euliini; Kuznetzov & Stekolnikov, 1977

= Euliini =

Tribe of moths

The Euliini are a tribe of tortrix moths.

== Distribution ==
Most Euliini (nearly 98%) are found in the Neotropics and a small number is found in the Nearctic. Only Eulia is found in the Old World, since it has a Holarctic distribution.

== Diversity ==
The tribe includes over 650 described species in nearly 90 genera. Most species have been described in recent years.

== Taxonomic history ==
The tribe was first proposed as Euliae by Kuznetsov and Stekolnikov (1977) as a subtribe of Cochylini. Powell elevated the group to tribal status in 1986. Research by Regier et al. in 2012 has provided fairly convincing evidence that Cochylini are a monophyletic lineage within a broader Euliini. If this is accepted, Cochylini should be treated as subtribe Cochylina of Euliini.

== Biology ==
The larvae of most species are leaf-rollers or leaf-folders. However, some may be gall-inducers or leaf litter-feeders.

== Genera ==
Abancaya
Accuminulia
Acmanthina
Acroplectis
Albadea
Anopina
Anopinella
Apolychrosis
Apotomops
Argentulia
Atepa
Atrocenta
Ayazua
Badiaria
Belemclepsis
Bicavernaria
Bidorpitia
Bolbia
Bonagota
Brazeulia
Brusqeulia
Chamelania
Chapoania
Characovalva
Chicotortrix
Chileulia
Chilips
Chinchipena
Chrysoxena
Cincorunia
Circapina
Clarkenia
Clarkeulia
Colosyta
Corneulia
Coryssovalva
Crocotania
Cuproxena
Cylichneulia
Deltinea
Deltobathra
Dimorphopalpa
Ditrifa
Dogolion
Dorithia
Ecnomiomorpha
Eliachna
Eriotortrix
Eristparcula
Ernocornutia
Ernocornutina
Eubetia
Eulia
Euryeulia
Ewunia
Exoletuncus
Furcinetechma
Galomecalpa
Gauruncus
Gnatheulia
Gnathocolumna
Gorytvesica
Gravitcornutia
Guarandita
Haemateulia
Harposcleritia
Hasteulia
Helicteulia
Hynhamia
Hypenolobosa
Hyptiharpa
Ibateguara
Icteralaria
Imelcana
Inape
Intritenda
Joaquima
Lanacerta
Limeulia
Liobba
Lobogenesis
Lydontopa
Marcelina
Meridagena
Meridulia
Meyathorybia
Moneulia
Monimosocia
Monochamia
Moronanita
Moronata
Mosaiculia
Neoeulia
Neomarkia
Nesochoris
Netechma
Netechmina
Netechmodes
Nunimeus
Odonthalitus
Oregocerata
Orthocomotis
Ortognathosia
Oryguncus
Ozotuncus
Palusita
Paramonochamia
Paramulia
Paraptila
Paratepa
Parexoletuncus
Pelzia
Pinhaisania
Placabis
Popayanita
Proathorybia
Proeulia
Psedaleulia
Pseudapina
Pseudomeritastis
Psiathovalva
Ptoseulia
Ptychocroca
Ptyongnathosia
Punctapinella
Punoa
Pycnocornuta
Quasieulia
Ramaperta
Ranapa
Razowskiina
Rebinea
Recintona
Rhythmologa
Romanaria
Rubroxena
Runtunia
Saetosacculina
Sagittranstilla
Saopaulista
Searenia
Seticosta
Simanica
Sinxema
Strophotina
Subrebinea
Subterinebrica
Subtranstillaspis
Tapinodoxa
Telurips
Terinebrica
Thalleulia
Thoridia
Toreulia
Tossea
Transtillaspis
Tylopeza
Uelia
Ulvipinara
Uncicida
Varifula
Villarica
Vulpoxena
Yanachagana
Xapamopa
Xoser
Zenenata

== Unplaced species ==
- Phtheochroa inexacta Butler, 1883
- Sericoris cauquenensis Butler, 1883

== Former genera ==
Mexiculia
Paraneulia
Pseudargyrotoza
