= Euryeulia =

Scientific classification
- Domain: Eukaryota
- Kingdom: Animalia
- Phylum: Arthropoda
- Class: Insecta
- Order: Lepidoptera
- Family: Tortricidae
- Tribe: Euliini
- Genus: Euryeulia; Brown, 2003

Genus of tortrix moths

Euryeulia is a genus of moths belonging to the family Tortricidae.

== Species ==
- Euryeulia biocellata (Walsingham, 1914)

== Etymology ==
The genus name is derived from Greek eurys (meaning broad) and Eulia, the type genus of the tribe.

== See also ==
- List of Tortricidae genera
