= Meridulia =

Scientific classification
- Kingdom: Animalia
- Phylum: Arthropoda
- Class: Insecta
- Order: Lepidoptera
- Family: Tortricidae
- Tribe: Euliini
- Genus: Meridulia; Razowski & Wojtusiak, 2006

Type species
- Meridulia meridana Razowski & Wojtusiak, 2006

Species
- 3 species (see text)

Genus of tortrix moths

Meridulia is a genus of moths of the family Tortricidae. It is known from Venezuela.

== Etymology ==
The genus name is a combination of Eulia and the province of Mérida in Venezuela.

== Species ==
There are three recognized species:

- Meridulia chaenostium Razowski & Wojtusiak, 2006
- Meridulia meridana Razowski & Wojtusiak, 2006
- Meridulia zerpana Razowski & Wojtusiak, 2006

Their wingspan is about 20 to 26 mm (0.79 to 1.02 in).

== See also ==
- List of Tortricidae genera
