= Dogolion textrix =

Scientific classification
- Kingdom: Animalia
- Phylum: Arthropoda
- Class: Insecta
- Order: Lepidoptera
- Family: Tortricidae
- Genus: Dogolion
- Species: D. textrix

Binomial name
- Dogolion textrix Razowski & Wojtusiak, 2006

Species of moth

Dogolion textrix is a species of moth of the family Tortricidae. It is known from Morona-Santiago Province, Ecuador. The holotype was obtained at 2,450 m (8,040 ft) above sea level.

== Etymology ==
The name Dogolion textrix refers to the intricate lineation on the forewing. In Latin, "textor" means "weaver".

== Description ==
This species is very similar to Dogolion oligodon from Ecuador, but is differentiated by its shorter termen on the forewing and greyish color.

The wingspread of this species is around 22 mm. Its head is covered with grayish white scales, and the head is gray in color. The labial palpus, at least 2mm long, is slender, whitish above at the end of median joint, and dark gray laterally in the last segment. The thorax is cream colored with brownish and grey marks. The forewing is narrow does not expand at terminal end, has a rather convex costa, short apex and fairly oblique straight termen. The background is creamy with dense sprinkling of grey and darker lines. The gray markings are indistinct; a black spot on costa outside two other small black spots that form median fascia followed by larger one running down vertical against tornus but not reaching interrupted line before it meets the apex through direct way. There are also two black spots before the apex and termen dotted with grey. Cream cilia are densely scaled grayly.The hind wing's distal part is creamy, suffused and strigulated with gray, and cilia are cream, mixed with some amount of grey in the apical third

The female genitalia have a large sterigma with elongated lateral parts, followed by a median sclerite. The colliculum is large and broadest in the middle, and the ductus bursae is slightly shorter. The corpus bursae has no sclerites.
