= Niphadophylax =

Scientific classification
- Domain: Eukaryota
- Kingdom: Animalia
- Phylum: Arthropoda
- Class: Insecta
- Order: Lepidoptera
- Family: Tortricidae
- Tribe: Euliini
- Genus: Niphadophylax; Diakonoff, 1992

Genus of tortrix moths

Niphadophylax is a genus of moths belonging to the subfamily Olethreutinae of the family Tortricidae.

== Species ==
- Niphadophylax albonigra Razowski & Wojtusiak, 2012
- Niphadophylax hemicycla Diakonoff, 1992
- Niphadophylax iorrhoa (Meyrick, 1914)
- Niphadophylax mexicanus (Razowski & Brown, 2004)
- Niphadophylax sophrona Razowski & Wojtusiak, 2012
- Niphadophylax spectata Razowski & Wojtusiak, 2012

== See also ==
- List of Tortricidae genera
