= Nunimeus numenius =

Scientific classification
- Kingdom: Animalia
- Phylum: Arthropoda
- Clade: Pancrustacea
- Class: Insecta
- Order: Lepidoptera
- Family: Tortricidae
- Genus: Nunimeus
- Species: N. numenius

Binomial name
- Nunimeus numenius Razowski & Becker, 2001

Species of moth

Nunimeus numenius is a species of moth of the family Tortricidae. It is found in Tungurahua Province, Ecuador.
