= Dimorphopalpa striatana =

Scientific classification
- Domain: Eukaryota
- Kingdom: Animalia
- Phylum: Arthropoda
- Class: Insecta
- Order: Lepidoptera
- Family: Tortricidae
- Genus: Dimorphopalpa
- Species: D. striatana

Binomial name
- Dimorphopalpa striatana Brown, 1999

Species of moth

Dimorphopalpa striatana is a species of moth of the family Tortricidae. It is found in Venezuela and Costa Rica.
