= Ecnomiomorpha =

Scientific classification
- Kingdom: Animalia
- Phylum: Arthropoda
- Class: Insecta
- Order: Lepidoptera
- Family: Tortricidae
- Tribe: Euliini
- Genus: Ecnomiomorpha; Obraztsov, 1959

Genus of tortrix moths

Ecnomiomorpha is a genus of moths belonging to the subfamily Tortricinae of the family Tortricidae.

== Species ==
- Ecnomiomorpha aurosa Razowski & Becker, 1999
- Ecnomiomorpha aurozodion Razowski & Becker, 1999
- Ecnomiomorpha belemia Razowski & Becker, 1999
- Ecnomiomorpha caracana Razowski & Becker, 1999
- Ecnomiomorpha chrestodes Razowski & Becker, 1999
- Ecnomiomorpha nigrivelata (Walsingham, 1914)
- Ecnomiomorpha novaelimae Razowski & Becker, 1999
- Ecnomiomorpha parae Razowski & Becker, 1999
- Ecnomiomorpha rondoniae Razowski & Becker, 1999
- Ecnomiomorpha tubulifera Razowski & Becker, 1999

== See also ==
- List of Tortricidae genera
