= Ewunia gemella =

Scientific classification
- Kingdom: Animalia
- Phylum: Arthropoda
- Clade: Pancrustacea
- Class: Insecta
- Order: Lepidoptera
- Family: Tortricidae
- Genus: Ewunia
- Species: E. gemella

Binomial name
- Ewunia gemella Razowski & Becker, 2002

Species of moth

Ewunia gemella is a species of moth of the family Tortricidae that is endemic to Puerto Rico.
