= Zenenata =

Scientific classification
- Kingdom: Animalia
- Phylum: Arthropoda
- Class: Insecta
- Order: Lepidoptera
- Family: Tortricidae
- Tribe: Euliini
- Genus: Zenenata; Razowski & Wojtusiak, 2008
- Species: Z. zenena

Binomial name
- Zenenata zenena Razowski & Wojtusiak, 2008

Genus of moths

Zenenata is a genus of moths belonging to the subfamily Tortricinae of the family Tortricidae. It consists of only one species, Zenenata zenena, which is found in Loja Province, Ecuador.

The wingspan is about 16.5 mm.

== See also ==
- List of Tortricidae genera
