= Proathorybia minima =

Scientific classification
- Kingdom: Animalia
- Phylum: Arthropoda
- Class: Insecta
- Order: Lepidoptera
- Family: Tortricidae
- Genus: Proathorybia
- Species: P. minima

Binomial name
- Proathorybia minima (Walsingham, 1914)

Synonyms
- Tortrix minima Walsingham, 1914

Species of moth

Proathorybia minima is a species of moth of the family Tortricidae. It is found in Tabasco, Mexico.
