= Parexoletuncus mundius =

Scientific classification
- Kingdom: Animalia
- Phylum: Arthropoda
- Class: Insecta
- Order: Lepidoptera
- Family: Tortricidae
- Genus: Parexoletuncus
- Species: P. mundius

Binomial name
- Parexoletuncus mundius Razowski, 1997

Species of moth

Parexoletuncus mundius is a species of moth of the family Tortricidae. It is found in Peru.
