= Dorithia tototuana =

Scientific classification
- Kingdom: Animalia
- Phylum: Arthropoda
- Clade: Pancrustacea
- Class: Insecta
- Order: Lepidoptera
- Family: Tortricidae
- Genus: Dorithia
- Species: D. tototuana

Binomial name
- Dorithia tototuana Brown, in Brown & Powell, 1991

Species of moth

Dorithia tototuana is a species of moth of the family Tortricidae. It is found in Oaxaca, Mexico.
