= Furcinetechma sangaycola =

Scientific classification
- Domain: Eukaryota
- Kingdom: Animalia
- Phylum: Arthropoda
- Class: Insecta
- Order: Lepidoptera
- Family: Tortricidae
- Genus: Furcinetechma
- Species: F. sangaycola

Binomial name
- Furcinetechma sangaycola Razowski & Wojtusiak, 2009

Species of moth

Furcinetechma sangaycola is a species of moth of the family Tortricidae. It is found in Ecuador (Morona-Santiago Province).

The wingspan is 20 millimetres (0.79 in).

== Etymology ==
The species name refers to the name of the Sangay National Park, where the species was first collected.
