= Atepa triplagata =

Scientific classification
- Domain: Eukaryota
- Kingdom: Animalia
- Phylum: Arthropoda
- Class: Insecta
- Order: Lepidoptera
- Family: Tortricidae
- Genus: Atepa
- Species: A. triplagata

Binomial name
- Atepa triplagata (Walsingham, 1914)

Synonyms
- Tortrix triplagata Walsingham, 1914

Species of moth

Atepa triplagata is a species of moth of the family Tortricidae. It is found in Tabasco, Mexico.

The wingspan is 11–15 mm. The forewings are whitish ochreous, shaded with pale fawn ochreous. There is an oblique dorsal blotch before the middle and an outwardly oblique costal blotch at about the middle, as well as a second smaller costal blotch before the apex. The hindwings are greyish, with a slight rosy tinge.
