= Characovalva dentiens =

Scientific classification
- Kingdom: Animalia
- Phylum: Arthropoda
- Clade: Pancrustacea
- Class: Insecta
- Order: Lepidoptera
- Family: Tortricidae
- Genus: Characovalva
- Species: C. dentiens

Binomial name
- Characovalva dentiens Razowski & Becker, 2000

Species of moth

Characovalva dentiens is a species of moth of the family Tortricidae. It is found in Costa Rica and Ecuador.

== Subspecies ==
- Characovalva dentiens dentiens (Costa Rica)
- Characovalva dentiens micra Razowski & Becker, 2002 (Ecuador)
