= Saetosacculina degenerans =

Scientific classification
- Kingdom: Animalia
- Phylum: Arthropoda
- Class: Insecta
- Order: Lepidoptera
- Family: Tortricidae
- Genus: Saetosacculina
- Species: S. degenerans

Binomial name
- Saetosacculina degenerans (Meyrick, 1930)

Synonyms
- Tortrix degenerans Meyrick, 1930

Species of moth

Saetosacculina degenerans is a species of moth of the family Tortricidae. It is found in Brazil.
