= Strophotina =

Scientific classification
- Kingdom: Animalia
- Phylum: Arthropoda
- Class: Insecta
- Order: Lepidoptera
- Family: Tortricidae
- Tribe: Euliini
- Genus: Strophotina; Brown, 1998

Species
- See text

Synonyms
- Chirotes Razowski & Becker, 1999 (preocc.); Prochirotes Razowski, 2001 (replacement name)

Genus of tortrix moths

Strophotina is a genus of moths belonging to the family Tortricidae.

== Species ==
- Strophotina apparata Razowski & Pelz, 2003
- Strophotina chorestis (Razowski & Becker, 1999)
- Strophotina curvidagus Brown, 1998
- Strophotina niphochondra (Razowski & Becker, 1999)
- Strophotina strophota Meyrick, 1926
