= Tossea =

Scientific classification
- Kingdom: Animalia
- Phylum: Arthropoda
- Class: Insecta
- Order: Lepidoptera
- Family: Tortricidae
- Tribe: Euliini
- Genus: Tossea; Razowski & Wojtusiak, 2008
- Species: T. setosa

Binomial name
- Tossea setosa Razowski & Wojtusiak, 2008

Genus of moths

Tossea is a genus of moths belonging to the subfamily Tortricinae of the family Tortricidae. It consists of only one species, Tossea setosa, which is found in Ecuador (Pichincha Province).

The wingspan is about 19.5 mm.

== See also ==
- List of Tortricidae genera
