= Ewunia aureorufa =

Scientific classification
- Kingdom: Animalia
- Phylum: Arthropoda
- Clade: Pancrustacea
- Class: Insecta
- Order: Lepidoptera
- Family: Tortricidae
- Genus: Ewunia
- Species: E. aureorufa

Binomial name
- Ewunia aureorufa Razowski & Becker, 2002

Species of moth

Ewunia aureorufa is a species of moth of the family Tortricidae. It is found in Mexico (Tamaulipas).
