= Chrysoxena auriferana =

Scientific classification
- Kingdom: Animalia
- Phylum: Arthropoda
- Class: Insecta
- Order: Lepidoptera
- Family: Tortricidae
- Genus: Chrysoxena
- Species: C. auriferana

Binomial name
- Chrysoxena auriferana (Busck, 1911)

Synonyms
- Tortrix auriferana Busck, 1911

Species of moth

Chrysoxena auriferana is a species of moth of the family Tortricidae. It is found in Paraná, Brazil.
