= Odonthalitus viridimontis =

Scientific classification
- Kingdom: Animalia
- Phylum: Arthropoda
- Class: Insecta
- Order: Lepidoptera
- Family: Tortricidae
- Genus: Odonthalitus
- Species: O. viridimontis

Binomial name
- Odonthalitus viridimontis Brown, 2000

Species of moth

Odonthalitus viridimontis is a species of moth of the family Tortricidae. It is found in Costa Rica.

The length of the forewings is 5-5.5 mm for males and 5-6.5 mm for females.
