= Proathorybia =

Scientific classification
- Kingdom: Animalia
- Phylum: Arthropoda
- Class: Insecta
- Order: Lepidoptera
- Family: Tortricidae
- Tribe: Euliini
- Genus: Proathorybia; Razowski, 1999

Synonyms
- Athorybia Razowski, 1997 (preoccupied)

Genus of tortrix moths

Proathorybia is a genus of moths belonging to the family Tortricidae.

== Species ==
- Proathorybia athorybia (Razowski, 1997)
- Proathorybia chlidonias Razowski, 1999
- Proathorybia meyi Razowski, 2001
- Proathorybia minima (Walsingham, 1914)
- Proathorybia unisignata Razowski & Pelz, 2003
- Proathorybia zonalis Razowski & Becker, 2000

== See also ==
- List of Tortricidae genera
