= Cincorunia uncicornia =

Scientific classification
- Kingdom: Animalia
- Phylum: Arthropoda
- Clade: Pancrustacea
- Class: Insecta
- Order: Lepidoptera
- Family: Tortricidae
- Genus: Cincorunia
- Species: C. uncicornia

Binomial name
- Cincorunia uncicornia Razowski & Becker, 2002

Species of moth

Cincorunia uncicornia is a species of moth of the family Tortricidae. It is found in Ecuador (Loja Province and Zamora-Chinchipe Province).
