= Oryguncus =

Scientific classification
- Kingdom: Animalia
- Phylum: Arthropoda
- Class: Insecta
- Order: Lepidoptera
- Family: Tortricidae
- Tribe: Euliini
- Genus: Oryguncus; Razowski, 1988

Synonyms
- Origuncus Razowski, 1988; Oryguncus Razowski, 1987

Genus of tortrix moths

Oryguncus is a genus of moths belonging to the family Tortricidae.

== Species ==
- Oryguncus oribasus Razowski, 1988

== See also ==
- List of Tortricidae genera
