= Meridulia meridana =

Scientific classification
- Domain: Eukaryota
- Kingdom: Animalia
- Phylum: Arthropoda
- Class: Insecta
- Order: Lepidoptera
- Family: Tortricidae
- Genus: Meridulia
- Species: M. meridana

Binomial name
- Meridulia meridana Razowski & Wojtusiak, 2006

Species of moth

Meridulia meridana is a species of moth of the family Tortricidae. It is known from Venezuela.

The wingspan is 20 millimetres (0.79 in).
