= Popayanita ptycta =

Scientific classification
- Kingdom: Animalia
- Phylum: Arthropoda
- Class: Insecta
- Order: Lepidoptera
- Family: Tortricidae
- Genus: Popayanita
- Species: P. ptycta

Binomial name
- Popayanita ptycta Razowski, 1987

Species of moth

Popayanita ptycta is a species of moth of the family Tortricidae. It is found in Colombia.
