= Pseudapina =

Scientific classification
- Domain: Eukaryota
- Kingdom: Animalia
- Phylum: Arthropoda
- Class: Insecta
- Order: Lepidoptera
- Family: Tortricidae
- Tribe: Euliini
- Genus: Pseudapina; Brown, 2003

Genus of tortrix moths

Pseudapina is a genus of moths belonging to the family Tortricidae.

== Species ==
- Pseudapina lanceovalva Brown, 2003

== Etymology ==
The genus name is a contraction of Greek pseudos (meaning false) and Anopina a genus with which the genus is superficially similar.

== See also ==
- List of Tortricidae genera
