= Ecnomiomorpha nigrivelata =

Scientific classification
- Kingdom: Animalia
- Phylum: Arthropoda
- Class: Insecta
- Order: Lepidoptera
- Family: Tortricidae
- Genus: Ecnomiomorpha
- Species: E. nigrivelata

Binomial name
- Ecnomiomorpha nigrivelata (Walsingham, 1914)

Synonyms
- Tortrix nigrivelata Walsingham, 1914

Species of moth

Ecnomiomorpha nigrivelata is a species of moth of the family Tortricidae. It is found in Panama.
