= Deltinea costalimai =

Scientific classification
- Kingdom: Animalia
- Phylum: Arthropoda
- Class: Insecta
- Order: Lepidoptera
- Family: Tortricidae
- Genus: Deltinea
- Species: D. costalimai

Binomial name
- Deltinea costalimai Pastrana, 1961

Species of moth

Deltinea costalimai is a species of moth of the family Tortricidae. It is found in Argentina.
