= Ranapa paranana =

Scientific classification
- Kingdom: Animalia
- Phylum: Arthropoda
- Clade: Pancrustacea
- Class: Insecta
- Order: Lepidoptera
- Family: Tortricidae
- Genus: Ranapa
- Species: R. paranana

Binomial name
- Ranapa paranana Razowski & Becker, 2000

Species of moth

Ranapa paranana is a species of moth of the family Tortricidae. It is found in Paraná, Brazil.
