= Psiathovalva =

Scientific classification
- Kingdom: Animalia
- Phylum: Arthropoda
- Class: Insecta
- Order: Lepidoptera
- Family: Tortricidae
- Tribe: Euliini
- Genus: Psiathovalva; Razowski, 1994

Genus of tortrix moths

Psiathovalva is a genus of moths belonging to the family Tortricidae.

== Species ==
- Psiathovalva spinacea Razowski, 1994

== See also ==
- List of Tortricidae genera
