= Chinchipena elettaria =

Scientific classification
- Kingdom: Animalia
- Phylum: Arthropoda
- Class: Insecta
- Order: Lepidoptera
- Family: Tortricidae
- Genus: Chinchipena
- Species: C. elettaria

Binomial name
- Chinchipena elettaria Razowski, 1999

Species of moth

Chinchipena elettaria is a species of moth of the family Tortricidae. It is found in Zamora-Chinchipe Province, Ecuador.
