= Cylichneulia telesocia =

Scientific classification
- Domain: Eukaryota
- Kingdom: Animalia
- Phylum: Arthropoda
- Class: Insecta
- Order: Lepidoptera
- Family: Tortricidae
- Genus: Cylichneulia
- Species: C. telesocia

Binomial name
- Cylichneulia telesocia Razowski, 1994

Species of moth

Cylichneulia telesocia is a species of moth of the family Tortricidae. It is found in Venezuela.
