= Moronanita =

Scientific classification
- Kingdom: Animalia
- Phylum: Arthropoda
- Class: Insecta
- Order: Lepidoptera
- Family: Tortricidae
- Tribe: Euliini
- Genus: Moronanita; Razowski & Wojtusiak, 2006
- Species: M. moruna

Binomial name
- Moronanita moruna Razowski & Wojtusiak, 2006

Monotypic genus of tortrix moths

Moronanita is a genus of moths of the family Tortricidae. It contains only one species, Moronanita moruna, which is found in Ecuador (Morona-Santiago).

The wingspan is 12.5 mm.

== See also ==
- List of Tortricidae genera
