= Cincorunia monstruncus =

Scientific classification
- Kingdom: Animalia
- Phylum: Arthropoda
- Clade: Pancrustacea
- Class: Insecta
- Order: Lepidoptera
- Family: Tortricidae
- Genus: Cincorunia
- Species: C. monstruncus

Binomial name
- Cincorunia monstruncus Razowski & Wojtusiak, 2008

Species of moth

Cincorunia monstruncus is a species of moth of the family Tortricidae. It is found in Loja Province, Ecuador.

The wingspan is 18 millimetres (0.71 in) for the holotype, a male.
