= Circapina =

Scientific classification
- Domain: Eukaryota
- Kingdom: Animalia
- Phylum: Arthropoda
- Class: Insecta
- Order: Lepidoptera
- Family: Tortricidae
- Tribe: Euliini
- Genus: Circapina; Brown, 2003

Genus of tortrix moths

Circapina is a genus of moths belonging to the family Tortricidae.

== Species ==
- Circapina flexalana Brown, 2003

== See also ==
- List of Tortricidae genera
