= Proathorybia athorybia =

Scientific classification
- Kingdom: Animalia
- Phylum: Arthropoda
- Class: Insecta
- Order: Lepidoptera
- Family: Tortricidae
- Genus: Proathorybia
- Species: P. athorybia

Binomial name
- Proathorybia athorybia (Razowski, 1997)

Synonyms
- Athorybia athorybia Razowski, 1997

Species of moth

Proathorybia athorybia is a species of moth of the family Tortricidae. It is found in Peru.
