= Dorithia trigonana =

Scientific classification
- Kingdom: Animalia
- Phylum: Arthropoda
- Clade: Pancrustacea
- Class: Insecta
- Order: Lepidoptera
- Family: Tortricidae
- Genus: Dorithia
- Species: D. trigonana

Binomial name
- Dorithia trigonana Brown & Obraztsov in Brown & Powell, 1991

Species of moth

Dorithia trigonana is a species of moth of the family Tortricidae. It is found in Arizona in the United States and Durango in Mexico.

The wingspan is 19–21 mm.
