= Ramaperta telemaca =

Scientific classification
- Kingdom: Animalia
- Phylum: Arthropoda
- Clade: Pancrustacea
- Class: Insecta
- Order: Lepidoptera
- Family: Tortricidae
- Genus: Ramaperta
- Species: R. telemaca

Binomial name
- Ramaperta telemaca Razowski & Becker, 2011

Species of moth

Ramaperta telemaca is a species of moth of the family Tortricidae. It is found in Brazil (Parana).

The wingspan is about 10 mm.

== Etymology ==
The specific name refers to the type locality.
