= Eriotortrix isipida =

Scientific classification
- Kingdom: Animalia
- Phylum: Arthropoda
- Class: Insecta
- Order: Lepidoptera
- Family: Tortricidae
- Genus: Eriotortrix
- Species: E. isipida

Binomial name
- Eriotortrix isipida Razowski, 1988

Species of moth

Eriotortrix isipida is a species of moth of the family Tortricidae. It is found in Colombia.
