= Saopaulista prima =

Scientific classification
- Kingdom: Animalia
- Phylum: Arthropoda
- Clade: Pancrustacea
- Class: Insecta
- Order: Lepidoptera
- Family: Tortricidae
- Genus: Saopaulista
- Species: S. prima

Binomial name
- Saopaulista prima Razowski & Becker, 2000

Species of moth

Saopaulista prima is a species of moth of the family Tortricidae. It is found in São Paulo, Brazil.
