= Pseudapina lanceovalva =

Scientific classification
- Domain: Eukaryota
- Kingdom: Animalia
- Phylum: Arthropoda
- Class: Insecta
- Order: Lepidoptera
- Family: Tortricidae
- Genus: Pseudapina
- Species: P. lanceovalva

Binomial name
- Pseudapina lanceovalva Brown, 2003

Species of moth

Pseudapina lanceovalva is a species of moth of the family Tortricidae. It is found in Venezuela.

The length of the forewings is 5.8-6.1 mm for males and 7 mm for females.
