= Strophotina strophota =

Scientific classification
- Kingdom: Animalia
- Phylum: Arthropoda
- Class: Insecta
- Order: Lepidoptera
- Family: Tortricidae
- Genus: Strophotina
- Species: S. strophota

Binomial name
- Strophotina strophota (Meyrick, 1926)

Synonyms
- Eulia strophota Meyrick, 1926

Species of moth

Strophotina strophota is a species of moth of the family Tortricidae. It is found in Colombia.
