= Deltobathra =

Scientific classification
- Kingdom: Animalia
- Phylum: Arthropoda
- Class: Insecta
- Order: Lepidoptera
- Family: Tortricidae
- Tribe: Euliini
- Genus: Deltobathra; Meyrick, 1923

Genus of tortrix moths

Deltobathra is a genus of moths belonging to the subfamily Tortricinae of the family Tortricidae.

== Species ==
- Deltobathra autarkia Razowski & Becker, 1999
- Deltobathra platamodes Meyrick, 1923

== See also ==
- List of Tortricidae genera
