= Dorithia semicirculana =

Scientific classification
- Domain: Eukaryota
- Kingdom: Animalia
- Phylum: Arthropoda
- Class: Insecta
- Order: Lepidoptera
- Family: Tortricidae
- Genus: Dorithia
- Species: D. semicirculana

Binomial name
- Dorithia semicirculana (Fernald, 1882)

Synonyms
- Tortrix semicirculana Fernald, 1882

Species of moth

Dorithia semicirculana is a species of moth of the family Tortricidae. It is found in the United States, where it has been recorded from Arizona, Colorado, New Mexico and Utah.

The wingspan is 18 mm.
