= Chamelania jaliscana =

Scientific classification
- Kingdom: Animalia
- Phylum: Arthropoda
- Class: Insecta
- Order: Lepidoptera
- Family: Tortricidae
- Genus: Chamelania
- Species: C. jaliscana

Binomial name
- Chamelania jaliscana Razowski, 2001

Species of moth

Chamelania jaliscana is a species of moth of the family Tortricidae. It is found in Jalisco, Mexico.
