= Palusita ochrans =

Scientific classification
- Kingdom: Animalia
- Phylum: Arthropoda
- Clade: Pancrustacea
- Class: Insecta
- Order: Lepidoptera
- Family: Tortricidae
- Genus: Palusita
- Species: P. ochrans

Binomial name
- Palusita ochrans Razowski & Becker, 2000

Species of moth

Palusita ochrans is a species of moth of the family Tortricidae. It is found in Minas Gerais, Brazil.
