= Rubroxena =

Scientific classification
- Kingdom: Animalia
- Phylum: Arthropoda
- Class: Insecta
- Order: Lepidoptera
- Family: Tortricidae
- Tribe: Euliini
- Genus: Rubroxena; Razowski & Pelz, 2007
- Species: R. rubra

Binomial name
- Rubroxena rubra Razowski & Pelz, 2007

Monotypic genus of tortrix moths

Rubroxena is a genus of moths belonging to the subfamily Tortricinae of the family Tortricidae. It consists of only one species, Rubroxena rubra, which is found in Ecuador (Azuay Province).

The wingspan is about 14 mm.

== See also ==
- List of Tortricidae genera
