= Villarica villaricae =

Scientific classification
- Kingdom: Animalia
- Phylum: Arthropoda
- Class: Insecta
- Order: Lepidoptera
- Family: Tortricidae
- Subfamily: Tortricinae
- Tribe: Euliini
- Genus: Vullarica; Razowski & Pelz, 2010
- Species: V. villaricae

Binomial name
- Villarica villaricae Razowski & Pelz, 2010

Species of moth

Villarica is a genus of moths belonging to the family Tortricidae. It contains only one species, Villarica villaricae, which is found in the Araucanía Region of Chile.

The wingspan is about 15 mm.
