= Monochamia monochama =

Scientific classification
- Kingdom: Animalia
- Phylum: Arthropoda
- Class: Insecta
- Order: Lepidoptera
- Family: Tortricidae
- Genus: Monochamia
- Species: M. monochama

Binomial name
- Monochamia monochama Razowski, 1997

Species of moth

Monochamia monochama is a species of moth of the family Tortricidae. It is found in Peru.
