= Ecnomiomorpha parae =

Scientific classification
- Kingdom: Animalia
- Phylum: Arthropoda
- Clade: Pancrustacea
- Class: Insecta
- Order: Lepidoptera
- Family: Tortricidae
- Genus: Ecnomiomorpha
- Species: E. parae

Binomial name
- Ecnomiomorpha parae Razowski & Becker, 1999

Species of moth

Ecnomiomorpha parae is a species of moth of the family Tortricidae. It is found in Pará, Brazil.
