= Simanica stenoptera =

Scientific classification
- Kingdom: Animalia
- Phylum: Arthropoda
- Class: Insecta
- Order: Lepidoptera
- Family: Tortricidae
- Genus: Simanica
- Species: S. stenoptera

Binomial name
- Simanica stenoptera Razowski, 1997

Species of moth

Simanica stenoptera is a species of moth of the family Tortricidae. It is found in Peru.
