= Deltobathra platamodes =

Scientific classification
- Kingdom: Animalia
- Phylum: Arthropoda
- Class: Insecta
- Order: Lepidoptera
- Family: Tortricidae
- Genus: Deltobathra
- Species: D. platamodes

Binomial name
- Deltobathra platamodes Meyrick, 1923

Species of moth

Deltobathra platamodes is a species of moth of the family Tortricidae. It is found in Peru.
