= Paratepa ferruginea =

Scientific classification
- Kingdom: Animalia
- Phylum: Arthropoda
- Clade: Pancrustacea
- Class: Insecta
- Order: Lepidoptera
- Family: Tortricidae
- Genus: Paratepa
- Species: P. ferruginea

Binomial name
- Paratepa ferruginea Razowski & Becker, 2001

Species of moth

Paratepa ferruginea is a species of moth of the family Tortricidae. It is found in the Federal District of Brazil.
