= Psedaleulia dumetosa =

Scientific classification
- Kingdom: Animalia
- Phylum: Arthropoda
- Class: Insecta
- Order: Lepidoptera
- Family: Tortricidae
- Genus: Psedaleulia
- Species: P. dumetosa

Binomial name
- Psedaleulia dumetosa Razowski & Pelz, 2003

Species of moth

Psedaleulia dumetosa is a species of moth of the family Tortricidae. It is found in Morona-Santiago Province, Ecuador.
