= Gnathocolumna =

Scientific classification
- Kingdom: Animalia
- Phylum: Arthropoda
- Class: Insecta
- Order: Lepidoptera
- Family: Tortricidae
- Tribe: Euliini
- Genus: Gnathocolumna; Razowski & Wojtusiak, 2010
- Species: G. asymmetra

Binomial name
- Gnathocolumna asymmetra Razowski & Wojtusiak, 2010

Genus of moths

Gnathocolumna is a genus of moths belonging to the subfamily Tortricinae of the family Tortricidae. It consists of only one species, Gnathocolumna asymmetra, which is found in Peru.

The wingspan is about 19 mm.

== See also ==
- List of Tortricidae genera
