= Telurips dubius =

Scientific classification
- Domain: Eukaryota
- Kingdom: Animalia
- Phylum: Arthropoda
- Class: Insecta
- Order: Lepidoptera
- Family: Tortricidae
- Genus: Telurips
- Species: T. dubius

Binomial name
- Telurips dubius Razowski & Wojtusiak, 2010

Species of moth

Telurips dubius is a species of moth of the family Tortricidae. It is found in Peru.

The wingspan is 15–17 mm.
