= Proathorybia chlidonias =

Scientific classification
- Kingdom: Animalia
- Phylum: Arthropoda
- Class: Insecta
- Order: Lepidoptera
- Family: Tortricidae
- Genus: Proathorybia
- Species: P. chlidonias

Binomial name
- Proathorybia chlidonias Razowski, 1999

Species of moth

Proathorybia chlidonias is a species of moth of the family Tortricidae. It is found in Pichincha Province, Ecuador.
