= Hyptiharpa =

Scientific classification
- Kingdom: Animalia
- Phylum: Arthropoda
- Class: Insecta
- Order: Lepidoptera
- Family: Tortricidae
- Tribe: Euliini
- Genus: Hyptiharpa; Razowski, 1992

Type species
- Hyptiharpa hypostas Razowski, 1992

Genus of tortrix moths

Hyptiharpa is a genus of moths belonging to the family Tortricidae.

== Species ==
- Hyptiharpa hypostas Razowski, 1992

== See also ==
- List of Tortricidae genera
