= Furcinetechma =

Scientific classification
- Kingdom: Animalia
- Phylum: Arthropoda
- Class: Insecta
- Order: Lepidoptera
- Family: Tortricidae
- Tribe: Euliini
- Genus: Furcinetechma; Razowski & Wojtusiak, 2008

Genus of moths

Furcinetechma is a genus of moths belonging to the family Tortricidae.

== Species ==
- Furcinetechma labonitae Razowski & Wojtusiak, 2009
- Furcinetechma magnifurca Razowski & Wojtusiak, 2008
- Furcinetechma sangaycola Razowski & Wojtusiak, 2009

== Etymology ==
The name refers to the bifurcate uncus and the name of the closely related genus Netechma.

== See also ==
- List of Tortricidae genera
