= Cylichneulia cylichna =

Scientific classification
- Domain: Eukaryota
- Kingdom: Animalia
- Phylum: Arthropoda
- Class: Insecta
- Order: Lepidoptera
- Family: Tortricidae
- Genus: Cylichneulia
- Species: C. cylichna

Binomial name
- Cylichneulia cylichna Razowski, 1994

Species of moth

Cylichneulia cylichna is a species of moth of the family Tortricidae. It is found in Venezuela.
