= Euryeulia biocellata =

Scientific classification
- Domain: Eukaryota
- Kingdom: Animalia
- Phylum: Arthropoda
- Class: Insecta
- Order: Lepidoptera
- Family: Tortricidae
- Genus: Euryeulia
- Species: E. biocellata

Binomial name
- Euryeulia biocellata (Walsingham, 1914)

Synonyms
- Tortrix biocellata Walsingham, 1914; Eulia biocellata

Species of moth

Euryeulia biocellata is a species of moth of the family Tortricidae. It is found at altitudes of 1,290 to 1,850 meters in the Sierra Madre Occidental of western Mexico. The habitat consists of pine-oak forests.

The length of the forewings is 5.9–7.2 mm for males and 8 mm for females. Adults have been recorded on wing from August to September.
