= Odonthalitus poas =

Scientific classification
- Domain: Eukaryota
- Kingdom: Animalia
- Phylum: Arthropoda
- Class: Insecta
- Order: Lepidoptera
- Family: Tortricidae
- Genus: Odonthalitus
- Species: O. poas

Binomial name
- Odonthalitus poas Brown, 2000

Species of moth

Odonthalitus poas is a species of moth of the family Tortricidae. It is found in Costa Rica.

The length of the forewings is 5–5.5 mm (0.20–0.22 in) for males and 6 mm (0.24 in) for females.
