= Strophotina curvidagus =

Scientific classification
- Kingdom: Animalia
- Phylum: Arthropoda
- Class: Insecta
- Order: Lepidoptera
- Family: Tortricidae
- Genus: Strophotina
- Species: S. curvidagus

Binomial name
- Strophotina curvidagus Brown, 1998

Species of moth

Strophotina curvidagus is a species of moth of the family Tortricidae. It is found in Costa Rica.
