= Subrebinea =

Scientific classification
- Kingdom: Animalia
- Phylum: Arthropoda
- Clade: Pancrustacea
- Class: Insecta
- Order: Lepidoptera
- Family: Tortricidae
- Tribe: Euliini
- Genus: Subrebinea; Razowski & Becker, 2000

Genus of tortrix moths

Subrebinea is a genus of moths belonging to the family Tortricidae.

== Species ==
- Subrebinea barrasiana Razowski & Becker, 2000

== See also ==
- List of Tortricidae genera
