= Circapina flexalana =

Scientific classification
- Kingdom: Animalia
- Phylum: Arthropoda
- Class: Insecta
- Order: Lepidoptera
- Family: Tortricidae
- Genus: Circapina
- Species: C. flexalana

Binomial name
- Circapina flexalana Brown, 2003

Species of moth

Circapina flexalana is a species of moth of the family Tortricidae. It is found at altitudes of 1,000–1,400 metres (3,300–4,600 ft) on the western side of the central Cordillera of Costa Rica.

The length of the forewings is 4.9–6.6 millimetres (0.19–0.26 in) for males and 7 millimetres (0.28 in) for females. Adults have been recorded on wing from February to December.
