= Eristparcula brunniuba =

Scientific classification
- Kingdom: Animalia
- Phylum: Arthropoda
- Clade: Pancrustacea
- Class: Insecta
- Order: Lepidoptera
- Family: Tortricidae
- Genus: Eristparcula
- Species: E. brunniuba

Binomial name
- Eristparcula brunniuba Razowski & Becker, 2001

Species of moth

Eristparcula brunniuba is a species of moth of the family Tortricidae. It is found in Loja Province, Ecuador.
