= Atepa sinaloana =

Scientific classification
- Domain: Eukaryota
- Kingdom: Animalia
- Phylum: Arthropoda
- Class: Insecta
- Order: Lepidoptera
- Family: Tortricidae
- Genus: Atepa
- Species: A. sinaloana

Binomial name
- Atepa sinaloana Razowski, 1992

Species of moth

Atepa sinaloana is a species of moth of the family Tortricidae. It is found in Sinaloa, Mexico.
