= Odonthalitus bisetanus =

Scientific classification
- Domain: Eukaryota
- Kingdom: Animalia
- Phylum: Arthropoda
- Class: Insecta
- Order: Lepidoptera
- Family: Tortricidae
- Genus: Odonthalitus
- Species: O. bisetanus

Binomial name
- Odonthalitus bisetanus Brown, 2000

Species of moth

Odonthalitus bisetanus is a species of moth of the family Tortricidae. It is found in Oaxaca, Mexico.

The length of the forewings is 7 mm.
