= Ibateguara spinosissima =

Scientific classification
- Kingdom: Animalia
- Phylum: Arthropoda
- Clade: Pancrustacea
- Class: Insecta
- Order: Lepidoptera
- Family: Tortricidae
- Tribe: Euliini
- Genus: Ibateguara; Razowski & Becker, 2011
- Species: I. spinosissima

Binomial name
- Ibateguara spinosissima Razowski & Becker, 2011

Species of moth

Ibateguara is a genus of moths belonging to the subfamily Tortricinae of the family Tortricidae. It consists of only one species, Ibateguara spinosissima, which is found in Brazil (Alagoas).

The wingspan is about 11 mm.

== See also ==
- List of Tortricidae genera
