= Sagittranstilla mageana =

Scientific classification
- Kingdom: Animalia
- Phylum: Arthropoda
- Clade: Pancrustacea
- Class: Insecta
- Order: Lepidoptera
- Family: Tortricidae
- Genus: Sagittranstilla
- Species: S. mageana

Binomial name
- Sagittranstilla mageana Razowski & Becker, 1999

Species of moth

Sagittranstilla mageana is a species of moth of the family Tortricidae. It is found in Rio de Janeiro, Brazil.
