= Gnatheulia gnathocera =

Scientific classification
- Kingdom: Animalia
- Phylum: Arthropoda
- Class: Insecta
- Order: Lepidoptera
- Family: Tortricidae
- Genus: Gnatheulia
- Species: G. gnathocera

Binomial name
- Gnatheulia gnathocera Razowski, 1997

Species of moth

Gnatheulia gnathocera is a species of moth of the family Tortricidae. It is found in Peru.
