= Colosyta ocystolus =

Scientific classification
- Kingdom: Animalia
- Phylum: Arthropoda
- Class: Insecta
- Order: Lepidoptera
- Family: Tortricidae
- Genus: Colosyta
- Species: C. ocystolus

Binomial name
- Colosyta ocystolus (Meyrick, 1932)

Synonyms
- Eulia ocystolus Meyrick, 1932; Exoletuncus ocystolus

Species of moth

Colosyta ocystolus is a species of moth of the family Tortricidae. It is found in Costa Rica.
