= Sinxema xenisma =

Scientific classification
- Kingdom: Animalia
- Phylum: Arthropoda
- Clade: Pancrustacea
- Class: Insecta
- Order: Lepidoptera
- Family: Tortricidae
- Genus: Sinxema
- Species: S. xenisma

Binomial name
- Sinxema xenisma Razowski & Becker, 2003

Species of moth

Sinxema xenisma is a species of moth of the family Tortricidae. It is found in Minas Gerais, Brazil.
