= Quasieulia =

Scientific classification
- Kingdom: Animalia
- Phylum: Arthropoda
- Clade: Pancrustacea
- Class: Insecta
- Order: Lepidoptera
- Family: Tortricidae
- Tribe: Euliini
- Genus: Quasieulia; Powell, 1986

Genus of tortrix moths

Quasieulia is a genus of moths belonging to the family Tortricidae.

== Species ==
- Quasieulia endela (Walsingham, 1914)
- Quasieulia hirsutipalpis (Walsingham, 1914)
- Quasieulia jaliscana Razowski & Brown, 2004
- Quasieulia mcguffini Powell, 1986

== See also ==
- List of Tortricidae genera
