= Psiathovalva spinacea =

Scientific classification
- Kingdom: Animalia
- Phylum: Arthropoda
- Class: Insecta
- Order: Lepidoptera
- Family: Tortricidae
- Genus: Psiathovalva
- Species: P. spinacea

Binomial name
- Psiathovalva spinacea Razowski, 1994

Species of moth

Psiathovalva spinacea is a species of moth of the family Tortricidae. It is found in Venezuela.
