= Atepa cordobana =

Scientific classification
- Domain: Eukaryota
- Kingdom: Animalia
- Phylum: Arthropoda
- Class: Insecta
- Order: Lepidoptera
- Family: Tortricidae
- Genus: Atepa
- Species: A. cordobana

Binomial name
- Atepa cordobana Razowski, 1992

Species of moth

Atepa cordobana is a species of moth of the family Tortricidae. It is found in Veracruz, Mexico.
