= Odonthalitus regilla =

Scientific classification
- Domain: Eukaryota
- Kingdom: Animalia
- Phylum: Arthropoda
- Class: Insecta
- Order: Lepidoptera
- Family: Tortricidae
- Genus: Odonthalitus
- Species: O. regilla

Binomial name
- Odonthalitus regilla (Walsingham, 1914)

Synonyms
- Tortrix regilla Walsingham, 1914; Eulia regilla

Species of moth

Odonthalitus regilla is a species of moth of the family Tortricidae. It is found in Guatemala.

The length of the forewings is 7.2 mm.
