= Thoridia =

Scientific classification
- Kingdom: Animalia
- Phylum: Arthropoda
- Clade: Pancrustacea
- Class: Insecta
- Order: Lepidoptera
- Family: Tortricidae
- Tribe: Euliini
- Genus: Thoridia; Brown, 1991
- Species: T. veirsi

Binomial name
- Thoridia veirsi Brown & Powell, 1991

Monotypic genus of tortrix moths

Thoridia is a genus of moths belonging to the family Tortricidae. It contains only one species, Thoridia veirsi, which is found in Costa Rica.

== See also ==
- List of Tortricidae genera
