= Paramonochamia moemae =

Scientific classification
- Kingdom: Animalia
- Phylum: Arthropoda
- Clade: Pancrustacea
- Class: Insecta
- Order: Lepidoptera
- Family: Tortricidae
- Genus: Paramonochamia
- Species: P. moemae

Binomial name
- Paramonochamia moemae Razowski & Becker, 2000

Species of moth

Paramonochamia moemae is a species of moth of the family Tortricidae. It is found in Santa Catarina, Brazil.
