= Icteralaria paula =

Scientific classification
- Kingdom: Animalia
- Phylum: Arthropoda
- Clade: Pancrustacea
- Class: Insecta
- Order: Lepidoptera
- Family: Tortricidae
- Genus: Icteralaria
- Species: I. paula

Binomial name
- Icteralaria paula Razowski & Becker, 2001

Species of moth

Icteralaria paula is a species of moth of the family Tortricidae. It is found in Costa Rica.
