= Badiaria plagiostrigata =

Scientific classification
- Domain: Eukaryota
- Kingdom: Animalia
- Phylum: Arthropoda
- Class: Insecta
- Order: Lepidoptera
- Family: Tortricidae
- Genus: Badiaria
- Species: B. plagiostrigata

Binomial name
- Badiaria plagiostrigata Razowski & Wojtusiak, 2006

Species of moth

Badiaria plagiostrigata is a species of moth of the family Tortricidae. It is found in Ecuador (Morona-Santiago Province).

The wingspan is about 23 millimetres (0.91 in) for females and 19 mm for males.
