= Tapinodoxa autonephes =

Scientific classification
- Kingdom: Animalia
- Phylum: Arthropoda
- Class: Insecta
- Order: Lepidoptera
- Family: Tortricidae
- Genus: Tapinodoxa
- Species: T. autonephes

Binomial name
- Tapinodoxa autonephes Meyrick, 1931

Species of moth

Tapinodoxa autonephes is a species of moth of the family Tortricidae. It is found in Paraguay.
