= Dimorphopalpa xestochalca =

Scientific classification
- Domain: Eukaryota
- Kingdom: Animalia
- Phylum: Arthropoda
- Class: Insecta
- Order: Lepidoptera
- Family: Tortricidae
- Genus: Dimorphopalpa
- Species: D. xestochalca

Binomial name
- Dimorphopalpa xestochalca (Meyrick, 1926)

Synonyms
- Tortrix xestochalca Meyrick, 1926

Species of moth

Dimorphopalpa xestochalca is a species of moth of the family Tortricidae. It is found in Colombia.
