= Limeulia curiosa =

Scientific classification
- Kingdom: Animalia
- Phylum: Arthropoda
- Clade: Pancrustacea
- Class: Insecta
- Order: Lepidoptera
- Family: Tortricidae
- Genus: Limeulia
- Species: L. curiosa

Binomial name
- Limeulia curiosa Razowski & Becker, 2000

Species of moth

Limeulia curiosa is a species of moth of the family Tortricidae. It is found in Minas Gerais, Brazil.
