= Odonthalitus lacticus =

Scientific classification
- Domain: Eukaryota
- Kingdom: Animalia
- Phylum: Arthropoda
- Class: Insecta
- Order: Lepidoptera
- Family: Tortricidae
- Genus: Odonthalitus
- Species: O. lacticus

Binomial name
- Odonthalitus lacticus Razowski, 1991

Species of moth

Odonthalitus lacticus is a species of moth of the family Tortricidae. It is found in Mexico in the states of Durango and Sinaloa.

The length of the forewings is 6.5 mm for males and 6–7 mm for females. The forewings are cream with a dark brown basal area. The hindwings are pale grey brown.
