= Icteralaria reducta =

Scientific classification
- Kingdom: Animalia
- Phylum: Arthropoda
- Clade: Pancrustacea
- Class: Insecta
- Order: Lepidoptera
- Family: Tortricidae
- Genus: Icteralaria
- Species: I. reducta

Binomial name
- Icteralaria reducta Razowski & Becker, 2001

Species of moth

Icteralaria reducta is a species of moth of the family Tortricidae. It is found in Costa Rica.
