= Chamelania auricoma =

Scientific classification
- Kingdom: Animalia
- Phylum: Arthropoda
- Class: Insecta
- Order: Lepidoptera
- Family: Tortricidae
- Genus: Chamelania
- Species: C. auricoma

Binomial name
- Chamelania auricoma Razowski & Pelz, 2003

Species of moth

Chamelania auricoma is a species of moth of the family Tortricidae. It is found in Morona-Santiago Province, Ecuador.
