= Hasteulia romulca =

Scientific classification
- Kingdom: Animalia
- Phylum: Arthropoda
- Class: Insecta
- Order: Lepidoptera
- Family: Tortricidae
- Genus: Hasteulia
- Species: H. romulca

Binomial name
- Hasteulia romulca Razowski, 1999

Species of moth

Hasteulia romulca is a species of moth of the family Tortricidae. It is found in Carchi Province, Ecuador.
