= Ecnomiomorpha rondoniae =

Scientific classification
- Kingdom: Animalia
- Phylum: Arthropoda
- Clade: Pancrustacea
- Class: Insecta
- Order: Lepidoptera
- Family: Tortricidae
- Genus: Ecnomiomorpha
- Species: E. rondoniae

Binomial name
- Ecnomiomorpha rondoniae Razowski & Becker, 1999

Species of moth

Ecnomiomorpha rondoniae is a species of moth of the family Tortricidae. It is found in Rondônia, Brazil.
