= Monochamia =

Scientific classification
- Kingdom: Animalia
- Phylum: Arthropoda
- Class: Insecta
- Order: Lepidoptera
- Family: Tortricidae
- Tribe: Euliini
- Genus: Monochamia; Razowski, 1997

Genus of tortrix moths

Monochamia is a genus of moths belonging to the family Tortricidae.

== Species ==
- Monochamia monochama Razowski, 1997

== See also ==
- List of Tortricidae genera
