= Meridagena =

Scientific classification
- Kingdom: Animalia
- Phylum: Arthropoda
- Class: Insecta
- Order: Lepidoptera
- Family: Tortricidae
- Tribe: Euliini
- Genus: Meridagena; Razowski & Wojtusiak, 2006
- Species: M. bicerithium

Binomial name
- Meridagena bicerithium Razowski & Wojtusiak, 2006

Monotypic genus of tortrix moths

Meridagena is a genus of moths of the family Tortricidae. It consists of only one species, Meridagena bicerithium, which is found in Venezuela.

The wingspan of Meridagena bicerithium is 13 mm.

== See also ==
- List of Tortricidae genera
