= Oryguncus oribasus =

Scientific classification
- Kingdom: Animalia
- Phylum: Arthropoda
- Class: Insecta
- Order: Lepidoptera
- Family: Tortricidae
- Genus: Oryguncus
- Species: O. oribasus

Binomial name
- Oryguncus oribasus Razowski, 1988

Species of moth

Oryguncus oribasus is a species of moth of the family Tortricidae. It is found in Peru.
