= Meyathorybia =

Scientific classification
- Kingdom: Animalia
- Phylum: Arthropoda
- Class: Insecta
- Order: Lepidoptera
- Family: Tortricidae
- Tribe: Euliini
- Genus: Meyathorybia; Razowski, 2003

Genus of tortrix moths

Meyathorybia is a genus of moths belonging to the family Tortricidae.

== Species ==
- Meyathorybia digitifera Razowski, 2003

== See also ==
- List of Tortricidae genera
