= Lydontopa polydonta =

Scientific classification
- Kingdom: Animalia
- Phylum: Arthropoda
- Class: Insecta
- Order: Lepidoptera
- Family: Tortricidae
- Genus: Lydontopa
- Species: L. polydonta

Binomial name
- Lydontopa polydonta Razowski & Pelz, 2003

Species of moth

Lydontopa polydonta is a species of moth of the family Tortricidae. It is found in Azuay Province, Ecuador.
