= Chrysoxena =

Scientific classification
- Kingdom: Animalia
- Phylum: Arthropoda
- Class: Insecta
- Order: Lepidoptera
- Family: Tortricidae
- Tribe: Euliini
- Genus: Chrysoxena; Meyrick, 1912

Genus of tortrix moths

Chrysoxena is a genus of moths belonging to the subfamily Tortricinae of the family Tortricidae.

== Species ==
- Chrysoxena auriferana (Busck, 1911)

== See also ==
- List of Tortricidae genera
