= Chicotortrix =

Scientific classification
- Kingdom: Animalia
- Phylum: Arthropoda
- Class: Insecta
- Order: Lepidoptera
- Family: Tortricidae
- Tribe: Euliini
- Genus: Chicotortrix; Razowski, 1987
- Species: C. zeteles

Binomial name
- Chicotortrix zeteles Razowski, 1987

Monotypic genus of tortrix moths

Chicotortrix is a genus of moths belonging to the family Tortricidae containing only one species, Chicotortrix zeteles, which is known from Colombia.

== See also ==
- List of Tortricidae genera
