= Furcinetechma magnifurca =

Scientific classification
- Domain: Eukaryota
- Kingdom: Animalia
- Phylum: Arthropoda
- Class: Insecta
- Order: Lepidoptera
- Family: Tortricidae
- Genus: Furcinetechma
- Species: F. magnifurca

Binomial name
- Furcinetechma magnifurca Razowski & Wojtusiak, 2008

Species of moth

Furcinetechma sangaycola is a species of moth of the family Tortricidae. It is found in Pichincha Province, Ecuador.

The wingspan is 17.5 mm.
