= Saetosacculina =

Scientific classification
- Kingdom: Animalia
- Phylum: Arthropoda
- Class: Insecta
- Order: Lepidoptera
- Family: Tortricidae
- Tribe: Euliini
- Genus: Saetosacculina; Razowski, 1990

Genus of tortrix moths

Saetosacculina is a genus of moths belonging to the family Tortricidae.

== Species ==
- Saetosacculina degenerans (Meyrick, 1930)

== See also ==
- List of Tortricidae genera
