= Meyathorybia digitifera =

Scientific classification
- Kingdom: Animalia
- Phylum: Arthropoda
- Class: Insecta
- Order: Lepidoptera
- Family: Tortricidae
- Genus: Meyathorybia
- Species: M. digitifera

Binomial name
- Meyathorybia digitifera Razowski, 2003

Species of moth

Meyathorybia digitifera is a species of moth of the family Tortricidae. It is found in Santa Catarina, Brazil.
