= Coryssovalva cosmocosta =

Scientific classification
- Kingdom: Animalia
- Phylum: Arthropoda
- Class: Insecta
- Order: Lepidoptera
- Family: Tortricidae
- Genus: Coryssovalva
- Species: C. cosmocosta

Binomial name
- Coryssovalva cosmocosta Razowski, 1987

Species of moth

Coryssovalva cosmocosta is a species of moth of the family Tortricidae. It is found in Colombia.
