= Quasieulia mcguffini =

Scientific classification
- Kingdom: Animalia
- Phylum: Arthropoda
- Clade: Pancrustacea
- Class: Insecta
- Order: Lepidoptera
- Family: Tortricidae
- Genus: Quasieulia
- Species: Q. mcguffini

Binomial name
- Quasieulia mcguffini Powell, 1986

Synonyms
- Quasieulia macduffini Razowski, 1997

Species of moth

Quasieulia mcguffini is a species of moth of the family Tortricidae. It is found in Durango, Mexico.
