= Ayazua =

Scientific classification
- Kingdom: Animalia
- Phylum: Arthropoda
- Clade: Pancrustacea
- Class: Insecta
- Order: Lepidoptera
- Family: Tortricidae
- Tribe: Euliini
- Genus: Ayazua; Razowski & Becker, 2011
- Species: A. hyeroglyphica

Binomial name
- Ayazua hyeroglyphica Razowski & Becker, 2011

Genus of moths

Ayazua is a genus of moths belonging to the subfamily Tortricinae of the family Tortricidae. It consists of only one species, Ayazua hyeroglyphica, which is found in Ecuador.

== See also ==
- List of Tortricidae genera
