= Dimorphopalpa =

Scientific classification
- Domain: Eukaryota
- Kingdom: Animalia
- Phylum: Arthropoda
- Class: Insecta
- Order: Lepidoptera
- Family: Tortricidae
- Tribe: Euliini
- Genus: Dimorphopalpa; Brown, 1999

Genus of tortrix moths

Dimorphopalpa is a genus of moths belonging to the family Tortricidae.

== Species ==
- Dimorphopalpa albopunctana Brown, 1999
- Dimorphopalpa lyonsae Razowski & Pelz, 2007
- Dimorphopalpa rutruncus Razowski & Pelz, 2007
- Dimorphopalpa striatana Brown, 1999
- Dimorphopalpa striatanoides Brown, 1999
- Dimorphopalpa teutoniana Brown, 1999
- Dimorphopalpa xestochalca (Meyrick, 1926)

== See also ==
- List of Tortricidae genera
