= Harposcleritia stictoneura =

Scientific classification
- Kingdom: Animalia
- Phylum: Arthropoda
- Class: Insecta
- Order: Lepidoptera
- Family: Tortricidae
- Genus: Harposcleritia
- Species: H. stictoneura

Binomial name
- Harposcleritia stictoneura (Meyrick, 1930)

Synonyms
- Tortrix stictoneura Meyrick, 1930

Species of moth

Harposcleritia stictoneura is a species of moth of the family Tortricidae. It is found in Brazil.
