= Psedaleulia qualitata =

Scientific classification
- Kingdom: Animalia
- Phylum: Arthropoda
- Class: Insecta
- Order: Lepidoptera
- Family: Tortricidae
- Genus: Psedaleulia
- Species: P. qualitata

Binomial name
- Psedaleulia qualitata Razowski, 1997

Species of moth

Psedaleulia qualitata is a species of moth of the family Tortricidae. It is found in Peru.
