= Limeulia cimoliochroa =

Scientific classification
- Kingdom: Animalia
- Phylum: Arthropoda
- Clade: Pancrustacea
- Class: Insecta
- Order: Lepidoptera
- Family: Tortricidae
- Genus: Limeulia
- Species: L. cimoliochroa

Binomial name
- Limeulia cimoliochroa Razowski & Becker, 2011

Species of moth

Limeulia cimoliochroa is a species of moth of the family Tortricidae. It is found in Minas Gerais, Brazil.

The wingspan is about 10 mm.
