= Paramulia =

Parmulia

Scientific classification
- Kingdom: Animalia
- Phylum: Arthropoda
- Class: Insecta
- Order: Lepidoptera
- Family: Tortricidae
- Tribe: Euliini
- Genus: Paramulia; Razowski & Wojtusiak, 2006
- Species: P. laculetana

Binomial name
- Paramulia laculetana Razowski & Wojtusiak, 2006

Monotypic genus of tortrix moths

Paramulia is a genus of moths belonging to the subfamily Tortricinae of the family Tortricidae. It consists of only one species, Paramulia laculetana, which is found in Venezuela.

The wingspan is about 29 mm.

== See also ==
- List of Tortricidae genera
