= Dorithia peroneana =

Scientific classification
- Domain: Eukaryota
- Kingdom: Animalia
- Phylum: Arthropoda
- Class: Insecta
- Order: Lepidoptera
- Family: Tortricidae
- Genus: Dorithia
- Species: D. peroneana

Binomial name
- Dorithia peroneana (Barnes & Busck, 1920)

Synonyms
- Tortrix peroneana Barnes & Busck, 1920

Species of moth

Dorithia peroneana is a species of moth of the family Tortricidae first described by William Barnes and August Busck in 1920. It is found in the US state of Arizona.

The wingspan is 17 mm.
