= Palusita paulista =

Scientific classification
- Kingdom: Animalia
- Phylum: Arthropoda
- Clade: Pancrustacea
- Class: Insecta
- Order: Lepidoptera
- Family: Tortricidae
- Genus: Palusita
- Species: P. paulista

Binomial name
- Palusita paulista Razowski & Becker, 2000

Species of moth

Palusita paulista is a species of moth of the family Tortricidae. It is found in São Paulo, Brazil.
