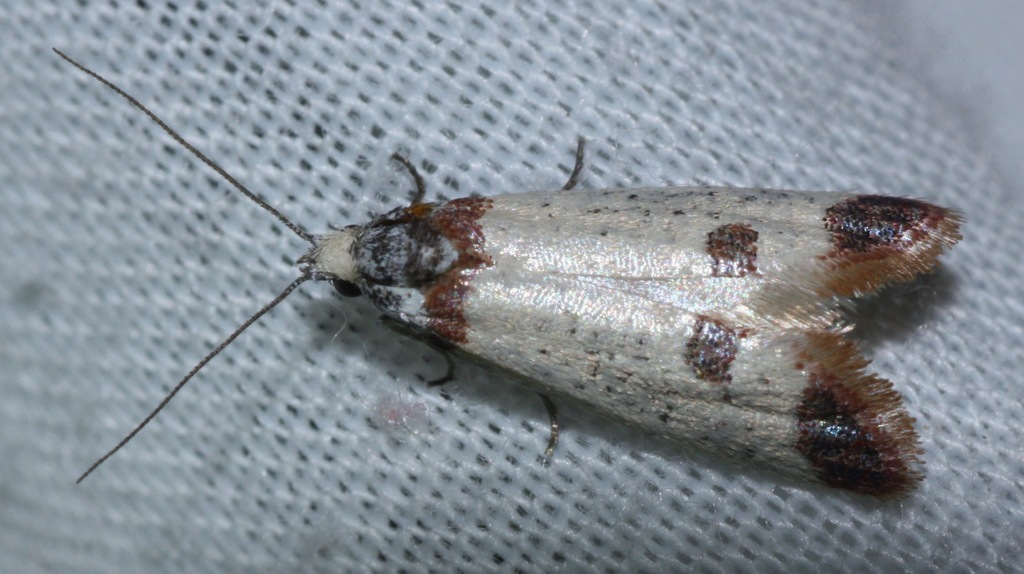

Scientific classification
- Kingdom: Animalia
- Phylum: Arthropoda
- Clade: Pancrustacea
- Class: Insecta
- Order: Lepidoptera
- Family: Tortricidae
- Tribe: Euliini
- Genus: Acroplectis; Meyrick, 1927

= Acroplectis =

Monotypic genus of tortrix moths

Acroplectis is a monotypic genus of moths belonging to the subfamily Tortricinae of the family Tortricidae. It contains only one species, Acroplectis haemanthes, which is found in the United States in Arizona, California, Nevada, New Mexico, Texas and Utah.

The length of the forewings is 6.5–8 mm. Adults have been recorded from April to July and in October.

== See also ==
- List of Tortricidae genera
