= Proathorybia meyi =

Scientific classification
- Kingdom: Animalia
- Phylum: Arthropoda
- Class: Insecta
- Order: Lepidoptera
- Family: Tortricidae
- Genus: Proathorybia
- Species: P. meyi

Binomial name
- Proathorybia meyi Razowski, 2001

Species of moth

Proathorybia meyi is a species of moth of the family Tortricidae. It is found in Santa Catarina, Brazil.
