= Hyptiharpa hypostas =

Scientific classification
- Kingdom: Animalia
- Phylum: Arthropoda
- Class: Insecta
- Order: Lepidoptera
- Family: Tortricidae
- Genus: Hyptiharpa
- Species: H. hypostas

Binomial name
- Hyptiharpa hypostas Razowski, 1992

Species of moth

Hyptiharpa hypostas is a species of moth of the family Tortricidae. It is found in Sinaloa, Mexico.
