= Icteralaria incusa =

Scientific classification
- Kingdom: Animalia
- Phylum: Arthropoda
- Class: Insecta
- Order: Lepidoptera
- Family: Tortricidae
- Genus: Icteralaria
- Species: I. incusa

Binomial name
- Icteralaria incusa (Meyrick, 1917)

Synonyms
- Cnephasia incusa Meyrick, 1917; Icteralaria ichnobursa Razowski, 1992

Species of moth

Icteralaria incusa is a species of moth of the family Tortricidae. It is found in Colombia.
