= Monimosocia parvisignis =

Scientific classification
- Kingdom: Animalia
- Phylum: Arthropoda
- Class: Insecta
- Order: Lepidoptera
- Family: Tortricidae
- Genus: Monimosocia
- Species: M. parvisignis

Binomial name
- Monimosocia parvisignis (Meyrick, 1931)

Synonyms
- Eulia parvisignis Meyrick, 1931

Species of moth

Monimosocia parvisignis is a species of moth of the family Tortricidae. It is found in São Paulo, Brazil.
