= Ortognathosia santamariana =

Scientific classification
- Kingdom: Animalia
- Phylum: Arthropoda
- Class: Insecta
- Order: Lepidoptera
- Family: Tortricidae
- Genus: Ortognathosia
- Species: O. santamariana

Binomial name
- Ortognathosia santamariana Razowski, 1988

Species of moth

Ortognathosia santamariana is a species of moth of the family Tortricidae. It is found in Guatemala.
