= Deltinea =

Scientific classification
- Kingdom: Animalia
- Phylum: Arthropoda
- Class: Insecta
- Order: Lepidoptera
- Family: Tortricidae
- Tribe: Euliini
- Genus: Deltinea; Pastrana, 1961

Genus of tortrix moths

Deltinea is a genus of moths belonging to the subfamily Tortricinae of the family Tortricidae.

== Species ==
- Deltinea costalimai Pastrana, 1961

== See also ==
- List of Tortricidae genera
