= Mosaiculia =

Scientific classification
- Kingdom: Animalia
- Phylum: Arthropoda
- Class: Insecta
- Order: Lepidoptera
- Family: Tortricidae
- Tribe: Euliini
- Genus: Mosaiculia; Razowski & Wojtusiak, 2009
- Species: M. mosaica

Binomial name
- Mosaiculia mosaica Razowski & Wojtusiak, 2009

Genus of moths

Mosaiculia is a genus of moths belonging to the subfamily Tortricinae of the family Tortricidae. It consists of only one species, Mosaiculia mosaica, which is found in Ecuador (Morona-Santiago Province).

The wingspan is about 22 mm.

== See also ==
- List of Tortricidae genera
