= Quasieulia jaliscana =

Scientific classification
- Domain: Eukaryota
- Kingdom: Animalia
- Phylum: Arthropoda
- Class: Insecta
- Order: Lepidoptera
- Family: Tortricidae
- Genus: Quasieulia
- Species: Q. jaliscana

Binomial name
- Quasieulia jaliscana Razowski & Brown, 2004

Species of moth

Quasieulia jaliscana is a species of moth of the family Tortricidae. It is found in the Mexican states of Jalisco, Oaxaca, Puebla and Veracruz.

The length of the forewings is 6.8-7.3 mm for males and 5.9-7.8 mm for females.

== Etymology ==
The species name refers to the state of Jalisco, Mexico.
