= Subtranstillaspis =

Scientific classification
- Domain: Eukaryota
- Kingdom: Animalia
- Phylum: Arthropoda
- Class: Insecta
- Order: Lepidoptera
- Family: Tortricidae
- Tribe: Euliini
- Genus: Subtranstillaspis; Razowski, 1990
- Species: S. hypochloris

Binomial name
- Subtranstillaspis hypochloris (Meyrick, 1932)

Synonyms
- Eulia hypochloris Meyrick, 1932

Monotypic genus of tortrix moths

Subtranstillaspis is a genus of moths belonging to the family Tortricidae. It contains only one species, Subtranstillaspis hypochloris, which is found in Costa Rica.
