= Odonthalitus conservanus =

Scientific classification
- Domain: Eukaryota
- Kingdom: Animalia
- Phylum: Arthropoda
- Class: Insecta
- Order: Lepidoptera
- Family: Tortricidae
- Genus: Odonthalitus
- Species: O. conservanus

Binomial name
- Odonthalitus conservanus Brown, 2000

Species of moth

Odonthalitus conservanus is a species of moth of the family Tortricidae. It is found in Jalisco, Mexico.

The length of the forewings is 5 mm for males and 6.5-6.8 mm for females.
