= Eriotortrix iresinephora =

Scientific classification
- Kingdom: Animalia
- Phylum: Arthropoda
- Class: Insecta
- Order: Lepidoptera
- Family: Tortricidae
- Genus: Eriotortrix
- Species: E. iresinephora

Binomial name
- Eriotortrix iresinephora Razowski, 1988

Species of moth

Eriotortrix iresinephora is a species of moth of the family Tortricidae. It is found in Colombia.
