= Ulvipinara =

Scientific classification
- Kingdom: Animalia
- Phylum: Arthropoda
- Class: Insecta
- Order: Lepidoptera
- Family: Tortricidae
- Tribe: Euliini
- Genus: ulvipinara Razowski & Pelz, 2007
- Species: U. pulvinaria

Binomial name
- Ulvipinara pulvinaria Razowski & Pelz, 2007

Monotypic genus of tortrix moths

Ulvipinara is a genus of moths belonging to the subfamily Tortricinae of the family Tortricidae. It consists of only one species, Ulvipinara pulvinaria, which is found in Ecuador.

The wingspan is about 19.5 mm.

== See also ==
- List of Tortricidae genera
