= Pelzia =

Scientific classification
- Kingdom: Animalia
- Phylum: Arthropoda
- Class: Insecta
- Order: Lepidoptera
- Family: Tortricidae
- Tribe: Euliini
- Genus: Pelzia; Razowski & Wojtusiak, 2008
- Species: P. alticolana

Binomial name
- Pelzia alticolana Razowski & Wojtusiak, 2008

Genus of moths

Pelzia is a genus of moths belonging to the subfamily Tortricinae of the family Tortricidae. It consists of only one species, Pelzia alticolana, which is found in Ecuador (Carchi Province).

The wingspan is about 24 mm.

== Etymology ==
The generic name is a patronym for Dr. Volker Pelz. The specific name refers to the high altitude of the collection site of the species and is derived from Latin altus (meaning high) and colana (meaning resident).

== See also ==
- List of Tortricidae genera
