= Searenia cuprea =

Scientific classification
- Kingdom: Animalia
- Phylum: Arthropoda
- Clade: Pancrustacea
- Class: Insecta
- Order: Lepidoptera
- Family: Tortricidae
- Genus: Searenia
- Species: S. cuprea

Binomial name
- Searenia cuprea Razowski & Becker, 2000

Species of moth

Searenia cuprea is a species of moth of the family Tortricidae. It is found in Santa Catarina, Brazil.It was first discovered by Józef Razowski and Victor O. Becker in the year 2000.
