= Neomarkia trifascia =

Scientific classification
- Kingdom: Animalia
- Phylum: Arthropoda
- Class: Insecta
- Order: Lepidoptera
- Family: Tortricidae
- Genus: Neomarkia
- Species: N. trifascia

Binomial name
- Neomarkia trifascia (Razowski, 2001)

Synonyms
- Markia trifasciata Razowski, 1999

Species of moth

Neomarkia trifascia is a species of moth of the family Tortricidae. It is found in Ecuador (Zamora Chinchipe Province and Morona-Santiago Province).
