= Odonthalitus fuscomaculatus =

Scientific classification
- Domain: Eukaryota
- Kingdom: Animalia
- Phylum: Arthropoda
- Class: Insecta
- Order: Lepidoptera
- Family: Tortricidae
- Genus: Odonthalitus
- Species: O. fuscomaculatus

Binomial name
- Odonthalitus fuscomaculatus Brown, 2000

Species of moth

Odonthalitus fuscomaculatus is a species of moth of the family Tortricidae. It is found in Michoacán, Mexico.

The length of the forewings is 7.5 mm.
