= Chamelania =

Scientific classification
- Kingdom: Animalia
- Phylum: Arthropoda
- Class: Insecta
- Order: Lepidoptera
- Family: Tortricidae
- Tribe: Euliini
- Genus: Chamelania; Razowski, 2001

Genus of tortrix moths

Chamelania is a genus of moths belonging to the family Tortricidae.

== Species ==
- Chamelania auricoma Razowski & Pelz, 2003
- Chamelania jaliscana Razowski, 2001

== See also ==
- List of Tortricidae genera
