= Ozotuncus ozotuncus =

Scientific classification
- Kingdom: Animalia
- Phylum: Arthropoda
- Class: Insecta
- Order: Lepidoptera
- Family: Tortricidae
- Genus: Ozotuncus
- Species: O. ozotuncus

Binomial name
- Ozotuncus ozotuncus Razowski, 1997

Species of moth

Ozotuncus ozotuncus is a species of moth of the family Tortricidae. It is found in Peru.
