= Dorithia =

Scientific classification
- Kingdom: Animalia
- Phylum: Arthropoda
- Clade: Pancrustacea
- Class: Insecta
- Order: Lepidoptera
- Family: Tortricidae
- Tribe: Euliini
- Genus: Dorithia; Powell, 1964

Genus of tortrix moths

Dorithia is a genus of moths belonging to the subfamily Tortricinae of the family Tortricidae.

== Species ==
- Dorithia consacculana Brown, in Brown & Powell, 1991
- Dorithia crucifer (Walsingham, 1914)
- Dorithia equadentana Brown, in Brown & Powell, 1991
- Dorithia imitatrix Brown & Obraztsov in Brown & Powell, 1991
- Dorithia meridionalis Brown, in Brown & Powell, 1991
- Dorithia occidentana Brown, in Brown & Powell, 1991
- Dorithia paraviridana Brown, in Brown & Powell, 1991
- Dorithia peroneana Barnes & Busck, 1920
- Dorithia powellana Brown, in Brown & Powell, 1991
- Dorithia pseudocrucifer Brown, in Brown & Powell, 1991
- Dorithia robustana Brown, in Brown & Powell, 1991
- Dorithia semicirculana (Fernald, 1882)
- Dorithia spinosana Brown, in Brown & Powell, 1991
- Dorithia strigulana Brown & Obraztsov in Brown & Powell, 1991
- Dorithia tototuana Brown, in Brown & Powell, 1991
- Dorithia trigonana Brown & Obraztsov in Brown & Powell, 1991
- Dorithia wellingana Brown, in Brown & Powell, 1991

== See also ==
- List of Tortricidae genera
