= Icteralaria idiochroma =

Scientific classification
- Domain: Eukaryota
- Kingdom: Animalia
- Phylum: Arthropoda
- Class: Insecta
- Order: Lepidoptera
- Family: Tortricidae
- Genus: Icteralaria
- Species: I. idiochroma

Binomial name
- Icteralaria idiochroma Razowski, 1992

Synonyms
- Icteralaria diochroma Razowski, 1992

Species of moth

Icteralaria idiochroma is a species of moth of the family Tortricidae. It is found in Costa Rica.
