= Odonthalitus orinoma =

Scientific classification
- Domain: Eukaryota
- Kingdom: Animalia
- Phylum: Arthropoda
- Class: Insecta
- Order: Lepidoptera
- Family: Tortricidae
- Genus: Odonthalitus
- Species: O. orinoma

Binomial name
- Odonthalitus orinoma (Walsingham, 1914)

Synonyms
- Tortrix orinoma Walsingham, 1914; Anopina orinoma

Species of moth

Odonthalitus orinoma is a moth of the family Tortricidae. It is found in Guerrero, Mexico.

The length of the forewings is 7.5 mm.
