= Niphadophylax mexicanus =

Scientific classification
- Domain: Eukaryota
- Kingdom: Animalia
- Phylum: Arthropoda
- Class: Insecta
- Order: Lepidoptera
- Family: Tortricidae
- Genus: Niphadophylax
- Species: N. mexicanus

Binomial name
- Niphadophylax mexicanus (Razowski & Brown, 2004)

Synonyms
- Odonthalitus mexicanus Razowski & Brown, 2004

Species of moth

Niphadophylax mexicanus is a species of moth of the family Tortricidae. It is found in Puebla, Mexico.

The length of the forewings is 7 mm.

== Etymology ==
The species name refers to the country of Mexico.
