= Quasieulia endela =

Scientific classification
- Domain: Eukaryota
- Kingdom: Animalia
- Phylum: Arthropoda
- Class: Insecta
- Order: Lepidoptera
- Family: Tortricidae
- Genus: Quasieulia
- Species: Q. endela

Binomial name
- Quasieulia endela (Walsingham, 1914)

Synonyms
- Tortrix endela Walsingham, 1914

Species of moth

Quasieulia endela is a species of moth of the family Tortricidae. It is found in Guatemala.
