= Dimorphopalpa rutruncus =

Scientific classification
- Kingdom: Animalia
- Phylum: Arthropoda
- Class: Insecta
- Order: Lepidoptera
- Family: Tortricidae
- Genus: Dimorphopalpa
- Species: D. rutruncus

Binomial name
- Dimorphopalpa rutruncus Razowski & Pelz, 2007

Synonyms
- Dimorphopapa rutruncus Razowski & Pelz, 2009

Species of moth

Dimorphopalpa rutruncus is a species of moth of the family Tortricidae. It is found in Ecuador.

The wingspan is 18.5–20 mm.
