= Meridulia chaenostium =

Scientific classification
- Domain: Eukaryota
- Kingdom: Animalia
- Phylum: Arthropoda
- Class: Insecta
- Order: Lepidoptera
- Family: Tortricidae
- Genus: Meridulia
- Species: M. chaenostium

Binomial name
- Meridulia chaenostium Razowski & Wojtusiak, 2006

Species of moth

Meridulia chaenostium is a species of moth of the family Tortricidae. It is known from Venezuela.

The wingspan is 26 millimetres (1.0 in).
