= Yanachagana =

Scientific classification
- Kingdom: Animalia
- Phylum: Arthropoda
- Class: Insecta
- Order: Lepidoptera
- Family: Tortricidae
- Tribe: Euliini
- Genus: Yanachagana; Razowski & Wojtusiak, 2010
- Species: Y. polyperla

Binomial name
- Yanachagana polyperla Razowski & Wojtusiak, 2010

Genus of moths

Yanachagana is a genus of moths belonging to the subfamily Tortricinae of the family Tortricidae. It consists of only one species, Yanachagana polyperla, which is found in Peru.

The wingspan is about 29 mm.

== See also ==
- List of Tortricidae genera
