= Dorithia meridionalis =

Scientific classification
- Kingdom: Animalia
- Phylum: Arthropoda
- Clade: Pancrustacea
- Class: Insecta
- Order: Lepidoptera
- Family: Tortricidae
- Genus: Dorithia
- Species: D. meridionalis

Binomial name
- Dorithia meridionalis Brown, in Brown & Powell, 1991

Species of moth

Dorithia meridionalis is a species of moth of the family Tortricidae. It is found in Costa Rica.
