= Dimorphopalpa teutoniana =

Scientific classification
- Domain: Eukaryota
- Kingdom: Animalia
- Phylum: Arthropoda
- Class: Insecta
- Order: Lepidoptera
- Family: Tortricidae
- Genus: Dimorphopalpa
- Species: D. teutoniana

Binomial name
- Dimorphopalpa teutoniana J.W.Brown, 1999

Species of moth

Dimorphopalpa teutoniana is a species of moth of the family Tortricidae. It is found in Santa Catarina, Brazil.
