= Telurips peruvianus =

Scientific classification
- Domain: Eukaryota
- Kingdom: Animalia
- Phylum: Arthropoda
- Class: Insecta
- Order: Lepidoptera
- Family: Tortricidae
- Genus: Telurips
- Species: T. peruvianus

Binomial name
- Telurips peruvianus Razowski, 1988

Species of moth

Telurips peruvianus is a species of moth of the family Tortricidae. It is found in Peru.
