= Strophotina niphochondra =

Scientific classification
- Kingdom: Animalia
- Phylum: Arthropoda
- Clade: Pancrustacea
- Class: Insecta
- Order: Lepidoptera
- Family: Tortricidae
- Genus: Strophotina
- Species: S. niphochondra

Binomial name
- Strophotina niphochondra (Razowski & Becker, 1999)

Synonyms
- Chirotes niphochondra Razowski & Becker, 1999

Species of moth

Strophotina niphochondra is a species of moth of the family Tortricidae. It is found in the Federal District of Brazil.
