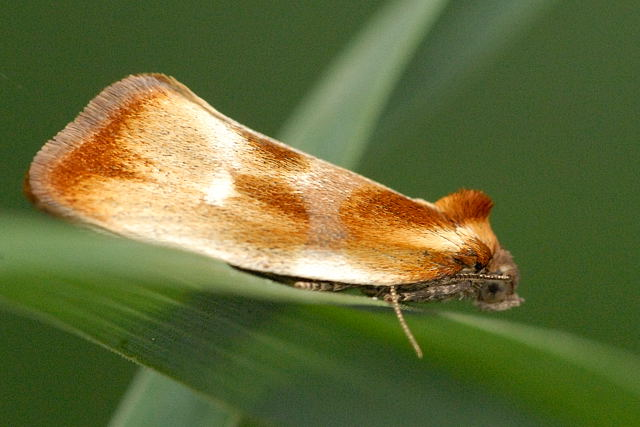

Scientific classification
- Kingdom: Animalia
- Phylum: Arthropoda
- Class: Insecta
- Order: Lepidoptera
- Family: Tortricidae
- Genus: Eulia
- Species: E. ministrana

Binomial name
- Eulia ministrana (Linnaeus, 1758)

Synonyms
- Phalaena (Tortrix) ministrana Linnaeus, 1758; Lophoderus ministrana ab. dilutana Strand, 1901; Olethreutes ferrugana Hübner, 1922; Tortrix ferugana Hübner, 1796-1799; Lophoderus ministrana ab. infuscanus Strand, 1901; Ptycholoma livoniana Duponchel, 1845; Lophoderus subfascianus Stephens, 1834

= Eulia ministrana =

Species of moth

Eulia ministrana is a moth of the family Tortricidae. It is found in the Palearctic and Nearctic realms.

The wingspan is 18–24 mm. The head is dark fuscous. The thorax is ferruginous-ochreous, with a large crest. The forewings are narrowed anteriorly and pale ochreous. The base of costa, a more or less developed very large triangular often pale-centred dorsal suffusion, and the terminal streak are all deep ferruginous. The cilia are dark ferruginous-fuscous. The hindwings are grey, the termen darker. The larva is light green head brown.

Adults are on wing from May to June. There is one generation per year.

The larvae feed on various shrubs and trees including Betula pendula, Rhamnus cathartica, Corylus avellana and Castanea sativa.
