= Furcinetechma labonitae =

Scientific classification
- Domain: Eukaryota
- Kingdom: Animalia
- Phylum: Arthropoda
- Class: Insecta
- Order: Lepidoptera
- Family: Tortricidae
- Genus: Furcinetechma
- Species: F. labonitae

Binomial name
- Furcinetechma labonitae Razowski & Wojtusiak, 2009

Species of moth

Furcinetechma labonitae is a species of moth of the family Tortricidae. It is found in Ecuador (Sucumbios Province).

The wingspan is 24 millimetres (0.94 in) for females and 21 millimetres (0.83 in) for males.

== Etymology ==
The species name refers to the type locality.
