= Placabis placabilis =

Scientific classification
- Kingdom: Animalia
- Phylum: Arthropoda
- Clade: Pancrustacea
- Class: Insecta
- Order: Lepidoptera
- Family: Tortricidae
- Genus: Placabis
- Species: P. placabilis

Binomial name
- Placabis placabilis Razowski & Becker, 2000

Species of moth

Placabis placabilis is a species of moth of the family Tortricidae. It is found in Carchi Province, Ecuador.
