= Eristparcula =

Scientific classification
- Kingdom: Animalia
- Phylum: Arthropoda
- Clade: Pancrustacea
- Class: Insecta
- Order: Lepidoptera
- Family: Tortricidae
- Tribe: Euliini
- Genus: Eristparcula; Razowski & Becker, 2001

Genus of tortrix moths

Eristparcula is a genus of moths belonging to the family Tortricidae.

== Species ==
- Eristparcula brunniuba Razowski & Becker, 2001
- Eristparcula ochriuba Razowski & Becker, 2001

== See also ==
- List of Tortricidae genera
