= Dorithia crucifer =

Scientific classification
- Domain: Eukaryota
- Kingdom: Animalia
- Phylum: Arthropoda
- Class: Insecta
- Order: Lepidoptera
- Family: Tortricidae
- Genus: Dorithia
- Species: D. crucifer

Binomial name
- Dorithia crucifer (Walsingham, 1914)

Synonyms
- Tortrix crucifer Walsingham, 1914

Species of moth

Dorithia crucifer is a species of moth of the family Tortricidae. It is found in Guatemala.
