= Tylopeza zelotypa =

Scientific classification
- Kingdom: Animalia
- Phylum: Arthropoda
- Class: Insecta
- Order: Lepidoptera
- Family: Tortricidae
- Genus: Tylopeza
- Species: T. zelotypa

Binomial name
- Tylopeza zelotypa (Meyrick, 1912)

Synonyms
- Eulia zelotypa Meyrick, 1912; Tylopeza zelotpya Brown & Razowski, 2003

Species of moth

Tylopeza zelotypa is a species of moth of the family Tortricidae. It is found in Colombia.
