= Ozotuncus =

Scientific classification
- Kingdom: Animalia
- Phylum: Arthropoda
- Class: Insecta
- Order: Lepidoptera
- Family: Tortricidae
- Tribe: Euliini
- Genus: Ozotuncus; Razowski, 1997

Genus of tortrix moths

Ozotuncus is a genus of moths belonging to the family Tortricidae.

== Species ==
- Ozotuncus ozotuncus Razowski, 1997

== See also ==
- List of Tortricidae genera
