= Pycnocornuta pyrausta =

Scientific classification
- Kingdom: Animalia
- Phylum: Arthropoda
- Class: Insecta
- Order: Lepidoptera
- Family: Tortricidae
- Genus: Pycnocornuta
- Species: P. pyrausta

Binomial name
- Pycnocornuta pyrausta Razowski, 1997

Species of moth

Pycnocornuta pyrausta is a species of moth of the family Tortricidae. It is found in Peru.
