= Icteralaria ecuadorica =

Scientific classification
- Domain: Eukaryota
- Kingdom: Animalia
- Phylum: Arthropoda
- Class: Insecta
- Order: Lepidoptera
- Family: Tortricidae
- Genus: Icteralaria
- Species: I. ecuadorica

Binomial name
- Icteralaria ecuadorica Razowski, 1999

Species of moth

Icteralaria ecuadorica is a species of moth of the family Tortricidae. It is found in Los Ríos Province, Ecuador.
