= Odonthalitus =

Scientific classification
- Kingdom: Animalia
- Phylum: Arthropoda
- Class: Insecta
- Order: Lepidoptera
- Family: Tortricidae
- Tribe: Euliini
- Genus: Odonthalitus; Razowski, 1991

Genus of tortrix moths

Odonthalitus is a genus of moths belonging to the family Tortricidae.

== Species ==
- Odonthalitus bisetanus Brown, 2000
- Odonthalitus conservanus Brown, 2000
- Odonthalitus fuscomaculatus Brown, 2000
- Odonthalitus improprius Brown, 2000
- Odonthalitus lacticus Razowski, 1991
- Odonthalitus orinoma (Walsingham, 1914)
- Odonthalitus poas Brown, 2000
- Odonthalitus regilla (Walsingham, 1914)
- Odonthalitus viridimontis Brown, 2000

== See also ==
- List of Tortricidae genera
