= Moneulia monilia =

Scientific classification
- Kingdom: Animalia
- Phylum: Arthropoda
- Clade: Pancrustacea
- Class: Insecta
- Order: Lepidoptera
- Family: Tortricidae
- Genus: Moneulia
- Species: M. monilia

Binomial name
- Moneulia monilia Razowski & Becker, 2002

Species of moth

Moneulia monilia is a species of moth of the family Tortricidae. It is found in Ecuador (Loja Province).

The wingspan is 17 millimetres (0.67 in).
