= Chinchipena =

Scientific classification
- Kingdom: Animalia
- Phylum: Arthropoda
- Class: Insecta
- Order: Lepidoptera
- Family: Tortricidae
- Tribe: Euliini
- Genus: Chinchipena; Razowski, 1999

Genus of tortrix moths

Chinchipena is a genus of moths belonging to the family Tortricidae.

== Species ==
- Chinchipena elettaria Razowski, 1999

== See also ==
- List of Tortricidae genera
