= Helicteulia heos =

Scientific classification
- Domain: Eukaryota
- Kingdom: Animalia
- Phylum: Arthropoda
- Class: Insecta
- Order: Lepidoptera
- Family: Tortricidae
- Genus: Helicteulia
- Species: H. heos

Binomial name
- Helicteulia heos Razowski, 1988

Species of moth

Helicteulia heos is a species of moth of the family Tortricidae. It is found in Bolivia.
