= Ramaperta perarmata =

Scientific classification
- Kingdom: Animalia
- Phylum: Arthropoda
- Clade: Pancrustacea
- Class: Insecta
- Order: Lepidoptera
- Family: Tortricidae
- Genus: Ramaperta
- Species: R. perarmata

Binomial name
- Ramaperta perarmata Razowski & Becker, 2000

Species of moth

Ramaperta perarmata is a species of moth. Coming from the Tortricidae family. It is found in Brazil (Santa Catarina).
