= Guarandita =

Scientific classification
- Kingdom: Animalia
- Phylum: Arthropoda
- Class: Insecta
- Order: Lepidoptera
- Family: Tortricidae
- Tribe: Euliini
- Genus: Guarandita; Razowski & Wojtusiak, 2008
- Species: G. bolivariana

Binomial name
- Guarandita bolivariana Razowski & Wojtusiak, 2008

Genus of moths

Guarandita is a genus of moths belonging to the subfamily Tortricinae of the family Tortricidae. It consists of only one species, Guarandita bolivariana, which is found in Bolívar Province, Ecuador.

The wingspan is about 16 mm.

== See also ==
- List of Tortricidae genera
