= Uncicida galerasiana =

Scientific classification
- Kingdom: Animalia
- Phylum: Arthropoda
- Class: Insecta
- Order: Lepidoptera
- Family: Tortricidae
- Genus: Uncicida
- Species: U. galerasiana

Binomial name
- Uncicida galerasiana Razowski, 1988

Species of moth

Uncicida galerasiana is a species of moth of the family Tortricidae. It is found in Colombia.
