= Badiaria =

Scientific classification
- Kingdom: Animalia
- Phylum: Arthropoda
- Clade: Pancrustacea
- Class: Insecta
- Order: Lepidoptera
- Family: Tortricidae
- Tribe: Euliini
- Genus: Badiaria; Razowski & Wojtusiak, 2006

Genus of tortrix moths

Badiaria is a genus of moths of the family Tortricidae.

== Species ==
- Badiaria plagiata Razowski & Wojtusiak, 2008
- Badiaria plagiostrigata Razowski & Wojtusiak, 2006

== Etymology ==
The name refers to brownish background colour of the wings of the type species and is derived from Latin badius (meaning brown).

== See also ==
- List of Tortricidae genera
