= Bicavernaria henicodes =

Scientific classification
- Kingdom: Animalia
- Phylum: Arthropoda
- Class: Insecta
- Order: Lepidoptera
- Family: Tortricidae
- Genus: Bicavernaria
- Species: B. henicodes

Binomial name
- Bicavernaria henicodes Razowski, 1988

Species of moth

Bicavernaria henicodes is a species of moth of the family Tortricidae. It is found in Peru.
