= Xapamopa =

Scientific classification
- Kingdom: Animalia
- Phylum: Arthropoda
- Class: Insecta
- Order: Lepidoptera
- Family: Tortricidae
- Tribe: Euliini
- Genus: Xapamopa; Razowski & Wojtusiak, 2010
- Species: X. oxapampa

Binomial name
- Xapamopa oxapampa Razowski & Wojtusiak, 2010

Genus of moths

Xapamopa is a genus of moths belonging to the subfamily Tortricinae of the family Tortricidae. It consists of only one species, Xapamopa oxapampa, which is found in Peru.

The wingspan is about 18 mm.

== See also ==
- List of Tortricidae genera
