= Liobba biloba =

Scientific classification
- Kingdom: Animalia
- Phylum: Arthropoda
- Clade: Pancrustacea
- Class: Insecta
- Order: Lepidoptera
- Family: Tortricidae
- Genus: Liobba
- Species: L. biloba

Binomial name
- Liobba biloba Razowski & Becker, 2000

Species of moth

Liobba biloba is a species of moth of the family Tortricidae. It is found in Rio de Janeiro, Brazil.
