= Ptoseulia ozonia =

Scientific classification
- Kingdom: Animalia
- Phylum: Arthropoda
- Class: Insecta
- Order: Lepidoptera
- Family: Tortricidae
- Genus: Ptoseulia
- Species: P. ozonia

Binomial name
- Ptoseulia ozonia Razowski, 1990

Species of moth

Ptoseulia ozonia is a species of moth of the family Tortricidae. It is found in Bolivia.
