= Neomarkia =

Scientific classification
- Kingdom: Animalia
- Phylum: Arthropoda
- Class: Insecta
- Order: Lepidoptera
- Family: Tortricidae
- Tribe: Euliini
- Genus: Neomarkia; Razowski, 2001

Synonyms
- Markia Razowski, 1999 (preocc.)

Genus of tortrix moths

Neomarkia is a genus of moths belonging to the family Tortricidae.

== Species ==
- Neomarkia trifascia (Razowski, 2001)

== See also ==
- List of Tortricidae genera
