= Dorithia paraviridana =

Scientific classification
- Kingdom: Animalia
- Phylum: Arthropoda
- Clade: Pancrustacea
- Class: Insecta
- Order: Lepidoptera
- Family: Tortricidae
- Genus: Dorithia
- Species: D. paraviridana

Binomial name
- Dorithia paraviridana Brown, in Brown & Powell, 1991

Species of moth

Dorithia paraviridana is a species of moth of the family Tortricidae. It is found in Guatemala.
