= Corneulia elata =

Scientific classification
- Kingdom: Animalia
- Phylum: Arthropoda
- Clade: Pancrustacea
- Class: Insecta
- Order: Lepidoptera
- Family: Tortricidae
- Genus: Corneulia
- Species: C. elata

Binomial name
- Corneulia elata Razowski & Becker, 1999

Species of moth

Corneulia elata is a species of moth of the family Tortricidae. It is found in Costa Rica.
