= Telurips =

Scientific classification
- Kingdom: Animalia
- Phylum: Arthropoda
- Class: Insecta
- Order: Lepidoptera
- Family: Tortricidae
- Tribe: Euliini
- Genus: Telurips; Razowski, 1988

Genus of tortrix moths

Telurips is a genus of moths belonging to the family Tortricidae.

== Species ==
- Telurips dubius Razowski & Wojtusiak, 2010
- Telurips peruvianus Razowski, 1988

== See also ==
- List of Tortricidae genera
