= Ewunia =

Scientific classification
- Kingdom: Animalia
- Phylum: Arthropoda
- Clade: Pancrustacea
- Class: Insecta
- Order: Lepidoptera
- Family: Tortricidae
- Tribe: Euliini
- Genus: Ewunia; Razowski & Becker, 2002

Genus of tortrix moths

Ewunia is a genus of moths belonging to the family Tortricidae.

== Species ==
- Ewunia aureorufa Razowski & Becker, 2002
- Ewunia gemella Razowski & Becker, 2002

== See also ==
- List of Tortricidae genera
