= Strophotina chorestis =

Scientific classification
- Kingdom: Animalia
- Phylum: Arthropoda
- Clade: Pancrustacea
- Class: Insecta
- Order: Lepidoptera
- Family: Tortricidae
- Genus: Strophotina
- Species: S. chorestis

Binomial name
- Strophotina chorestis (Razowski & Becker, 1999)

Synonyms
- Chirotes chorestis Razowski & Becker, 1999; Chirotes choretis Razowski & Becker, 1999

Species of moth

Strophotina chorestis is a species of moth of the family Tortricidae. It is found in Napo Province, Ecuador.
