= Deltobathra autarkia =

Scientific classification
- Kingdom: Animalia
- Phylum: Arthropoda
- Clade: Pancrustacea
- Class: Insecta
- Order: Lepidoptera
- Family: Tortricidae
- Genus: Deltobathra
- Species: D. autarkia

Binomial name
- Deltobathra autarkia Razowski & Becker, 1999

Species of moth

Deltobathra autarkia is a species of moth of the family Tortricidae. It is found in Minas Gerais, Brazil.
