= Ditrifa =

Scientific classification
- Kingdom: Animalia
- Phylum: Arthropoda
- Class: Insecta
- Order: Lepidoptera
- Family: Tortricidae
- Tribe: Euliini
- Genus: Ditrifa; Razowski & Wojtusiak, 2006
- Species: D. trifida

Binomial name
- Ditrifa trifida Razowski & Wojtusiak, 2006

Monotypic genus of tortrix moths

Ditrifa is a genus of moths of the family Tortricidae. It contains only one species, Ditrifa trifida, which is found in Venezuela.

The wingspan is 24–26 mm.

== Etymology ==
The species name is derived from trifidus (meaning divided into three branches). The genus name is an anagram of this name.

== See also ==
- List of Tortricidae genera
