= Ramaperta =

Scientific classification
- Kingdom: Animalia
- Phylum: Arthropoda
- Clade: Pancrustacea
- Class: Insecta
- Order: Lepidoptera
- Family: Tortricidae
- Tribe: Euliini
- Genus: Ramaperta; Razowski & Becker, 2000

Genus of tortrix moths

Ramaperta is a genus of moths belonging to the family Tortricidae.

== Species ==
- Ramaperta perarmata Razowski & Becker, 2000
- Ramaperta telemaca Razowski & Becker, 2011

== See also ==
- List of Tortricidae genera
