= Atrocenta =

Scientific classification
- Kingdom: Animalia
- Phylum: Arthropoda
- Class: Insecta
- Order: Lepidoptera
- Family: Tortricidae
- Tribe: Euliini
- Genus: Atrocenta; Razowski & Wojtusiak, 2009
- Species: A. centrata

Binomial name
- Atrocenta centrata Razowski & Wojtusiak, 2009

Genus of moths

Atrocenta is a genus of moths belonging to the subfamily Tortricinae of the family Tortricidae. It consists of only one species, Atrocenta centrata, which is found in Ecuador (Tungurahua Province).

The wingspan is about 20 millimetres (0.79 in).

== See also ==
- List of Tortricidae genera
