= Atepa =

Scientific classification
- Domain: Eukaryota
- Kingdom: Animalia
- Phylum: Arthropoda
- Class: Insecta
- Order: Lepidoptera
- Family: Tortricidae
- Tribe: Euliini
- Genus: Atepa; Meyrick, 1881

Synonyms
- Apeta Razowski, 1992

Genus of tortrix moths

Atepa is a genus of moths belonging to family Tortricidae.

== Species ==
- Atepa colaptes Razowski, 1992
- Atepa cordobana Razowski, 1992
- Atepa sinaloana Razowski, 1992
- Atepa triplagata (Walsingham, 1914)

== See also ==
- List of Tortricidae genera
