= Psedaleulia manapilao =

Scientific classification
- Domain: Eukaryota
- Kingdom: Animalia
- Phylum: Arthropoda
- Class: Insecta
- Order: Lepidoptera
- Family: Tortricidae
- Genus: Psedaleulia
- Species: P. manapilao

Binomial name
- Psedaleulia manapilao Razowski & Wojtusiak, 2008

Species of moth

Psedaleulia manapilao is a species of moth of the family Tortricidae. It is found in Cotopaxi Province, Ecuador.

The wingspan is about 17.5 mm (0.69 in).
