= Intritenda =

Scientific classification
- Kingdom: Animalia
- Phylum: Arthropoda
- Class: Insecta
- Order: Lepidoptera
- Family: Tortricidae
- Tribe: Euliini
- Genus: Intritenda; Razowski & Wojtusiak, 2008
- Species: I. tridentina

Binomial name
- Intritenda tridentina Razowski & Wojtusiak, 2008

Genus of moths

Intritenda is a genus of moths belonging to the subfamily Tortricinae of the family Tortricidae. It consists of only one species, Intritenda tridentina, which is found in Ecuador (Loja Province).

The wingspan is about 18,5 mm.

== See also ==
- List of Tortricidae genera
