= Meridulia zerpana =

Scientific classification
- Domain: Eukaryota
- Kingdom: Animalia
- Phylum: Arthropoda
- Class: Insecta
- Order: Lepidoptera
- Family: Tortricidae
- Genus: Meridulia
- Species: M. zerpana

Binomial name
- Meridulia zerpana Razowski & Wojtusiak, 2006

Species of moth

Meridulia zerpana is a species of moth of the family Tortricidae. It is known from Venezuela.

The wingspan is 21 mm (0.83 in).

== Etymology ==
The species name refers to its type locality: Mount Zerpa.
