= Crocotania crocota =

Scientific classification
- Kingdom: Animalia
- Phylum: Arthropoda
- Clade: Pancrustacea
- Class: Insecta
- Order: Lepidoptera
- Family: Tortricidae
- Genus: Crocotania
- Species: C. crocota

Binomial name
- Crocotania crocota Razowski & Becker, 2003

Species of moth

Crocotania crocota is a species of moth of the family Tortricidae. It is found in Brazil (Distrito Federal).
