= Ernocornutina gambra =

Scientific classification
- Kingdom: Animalia
- Phylum: Arthropoda
- Class: Insecta
- Order: Lepidoptera
- Family: Tortricidae
- Genus: Ernocornutina
- Species: E. gambra

Binomial name
- Ernocornutina gambra Razowski, 1988

Species of moth

Ernocornutina gambra is a species of moth of the family Tortricidae. It is found in Argentina.
