= Dimorphopalpa lyonsae =

Scientific classification
- Kingdom: Animalia
- Phylum: Arthropoda
- Class: Insecta
- Order: Lepidoptera
- Family: Tortricidae
- Genus: Dimorphopalpa
- Species: D. lyonsae

Binomial name
- Dimorphopalpa lyonsae Razowski & Pelz, 2007

Species of moth

Dimorphopalpa lyonsae is a species of moth of the family Tortricidae. It is found in Ecuador.

The wingspan is 14.5–16 mm for males and about 19 mm for females.

== Etymology ==
The species is named after Dr. Jane Lyons.
