= Belemclepsis belemana =

Scientific classification
- Kingdom: Animalia
- Phylum: Arthropoda
- Clade: Pancrustacea
- Class: Insecta
- Order: Lepidoptera
- Family: Tortricidae
- Genus: Belemclepsis
- Species: B. belemana

Binomial name
- Belemclepsis belemana Razowski & Becker, 2000

Species of moth

Belemclepsis belemana is a species of moth of the family Tortricidae. It is found in Pará, Brazil.
