= Tapinodoxa =

Scientific classification
- Kingdom: Animalia
- Phylum: Arthropoda
- Class: Insecta
- Order: Lepidoptera
- Family: Tortricidae
- Tribe: Euliini
- Genus: Tapinodoxa; Meyrick, 1931

Genus of tortrix moths

Tapinodoxa is a genus of moths belonging to the family Tortricidae.

== Species ==
- Tapinodoxa autonephes Meyrick, 1931

== See also ==
- List of Tortricidae genera
