= Icteralaria =

Scientific classification
- Kingdom: Animalia
- Phylum: Arthropoda
- Class: Insecta
- Order: Lepidoptera
- Family: Tortricidae
- Tribe: Euliini
- Genus: Icteralaria; Razowski, 1992

Genus of tortrix moths

Icteralaria is a genus of moths belonging to the family Tortricidae.

== Species ==
- Icteralaria ecuadorica Razowski, 1999
- Icteralaria idiochroma Razowski, 1992
- Icteralaria incusa (Meyrick, 1917)
- Icteralaria paula Razowski & Becker, 2001
- Icteralaria reducta Razowski & Becker, 2001

== See also ==
- List of Tortricidae genera
