= Imelcana =

Scientific classification
- Kingdom: Animalia
- Phylum: Arthropoda
- Class: Insecta
- Order: Lepidoptera
- Family: Tortricidae
- Tribe: Euliini
- Genus: Imelcana; Razowski & Wojtusiak, 2006

Species
- Imelcana camelina Razowski & Wojtusiak, 2006

Genus of tortrix moths

Imelcana is a monotypic genus of moths of the family Tortricidae. The sole species is Imelcana camelina. The genus is known from Venezuela.

== Etymology ==
The specific name camelina refers to a hump-like lobe at mid-costa and is derived from Latin camelinus, meaning "similar to a camel". The genus name is an anagram of this name.

== Description ==
The wingspan of Imelcana camelina is 17 mm (0.67 in).

== See also ==
- List of Tortricidae genera
