= Pinhaisania crispula =

Scientific classification
- Kingdom: Animalia
- Phylum: Arthropoda
- Clade: Pancrustacea
- Class: Insecta
- Order: Lepidoptera
- Family: Tortricidae
- Genus: Pinhaisania
- Species: P. crispula

Binomial name
- Pinhaisania crispula Razowski & Becker, 2000

Species of moth

Pinhaisania crispula is a species of moth of the family Tortricidae. It is found in Paraná, Brazil.
