= Runtunia =

Scientific classification
- Kingdom: Animalia
- Phylum: Arthropoda
- Class: Insecta
- Order: Lepidoptera
- Family: Tortricidae
- Subfamily: Tortricinae
- Tribe: Cochylini
- Genus: Runtunia; Razowski & Wojtusiak, 2008
- Species: R. runtunica

Binomial name
- Runtunia runtunica Razowski & Wojtusiak, 2008

Genus of moths

Runtunia is a genus of moths belonging to the subfamily Tortricinae of the family Tortricidae. It consists of only one species, Runtunia runtunica, which is found in Ecuador in the provinces of Pichincha and Napo and in Bolivia.

The wingspan is about 18 mm.

== See also ==
- List of Tortricidae genera
