= Abancaya =

Scientific classification
- Kingdom: Animalia
- Phylum: Arthropoda
- Class: Insecta
- Order: Lepidoptera
- Family: Tortricidae
- Subfamily: Tortricinae
- Tribe: Cochylini
- Genus: Abancaya; Razowski, 1997
- Species: A. gnypeta

Binomial name
- Abancaya gnypeta Razowski, 1997

Genus of tortrix moths

Abancaya is a monotypic genus of tortrix moths belonging to the tribe Cochylini of subfamily Tortricinae.

Its sole species is Abancaya gnypeta, which is found in Peru. Both taxa were described by Józef Razowski in 1997.
