= Albadea =

Scientific classification
- Kingdom: Animalia
- Phylum: Arthropoda
- Clade: Pancrustacea
- Class: Insecta
- Order: Lepidoptera
- Family: Tortricidae
- Genus: Albadea; Razowski & Becker, 2002
- Species: A. dea

Binomial name
- Albadea dea Razowski & Becker, 2002

Genus of tortrix moths

Albadea is a monotypic genus of moths belonging to the subfamily Tortricinae of the family Tortricidae. The sole species is Albadea dea. It is found in Carchi and Zamora-Chinchipe Provinces, Ecuador.

The wingspan of Albadea dea males is 13 millimetres (0.51 in).

== See also ==
- List of Tortricidae genera
