= Lanacerta =

Scientific classification
- Kingdom: Animalia
- Phylum: Arthropoda
- Clade: Pancrustacea
- Class: Insecta
- Order: Lepidoptera
- Family: Tortricidae
- Genus: Lanacerta; Razowski & Becker, 2002
- Species: L. lacertana

Binomial name
- Lanacerta lacertana (Zeller, 1866)

Synonyms
- Sciaphila lacertana Zeller, 1866

Genus of tortrix moths

Lanacerta is a monotypic genus of moths of the family Tortricidae. The sole species is Lanacerta lacertana. The genus is known from Colombia and Venezuela.

== See also ==
- List of Tortricidae genera
