= Dogolion oligodon =

Scientific classification
- Kingdom: Animalia
- Phylum: Arthropoda
- Class: Insecta
- Order: Lepidoptera
- Family: Tortricidae
- Genus: Dogolion
- Species: D. oligodon

Binomial name
- Dogolion oligodon Razowski & Pelz, 2003

Species of moth

Dogolion oligodon is a species of moth of the family Tortricidae. It is found in the Morona-Santiago Province of Ecuador.
