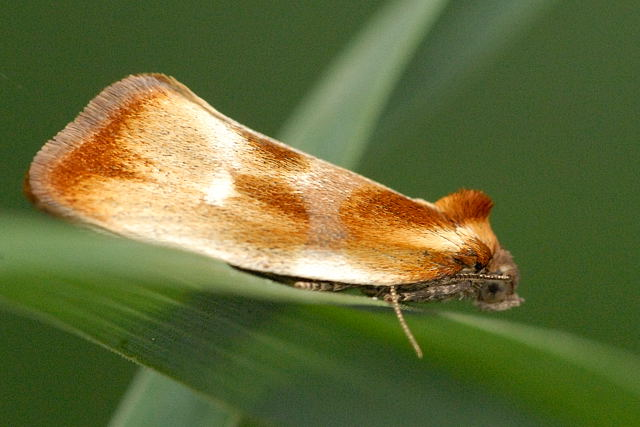
- Eulia ministrana

Scientific classification
- Domain: Eukaryota
- Kingdom: Animalia
- Phylum: Arthropoda
- Class: Insecta
- Order: Lepidoptera
- Family: Tortricidae
- Tribe: Euliini
- Genus: Eulia; Hubner, [1825]

Synonyms
- Lophoderus Stephens, 1829

= Eulia =

Genus of tortrix moths

Eulia is a genus of moths belonging to the subfamily Tortricinae of the family Tortricidae.

== Species ==
- Eulia ministrana (Linnaeus, 1758)

== See also ==
- List of Tortricidae genera
