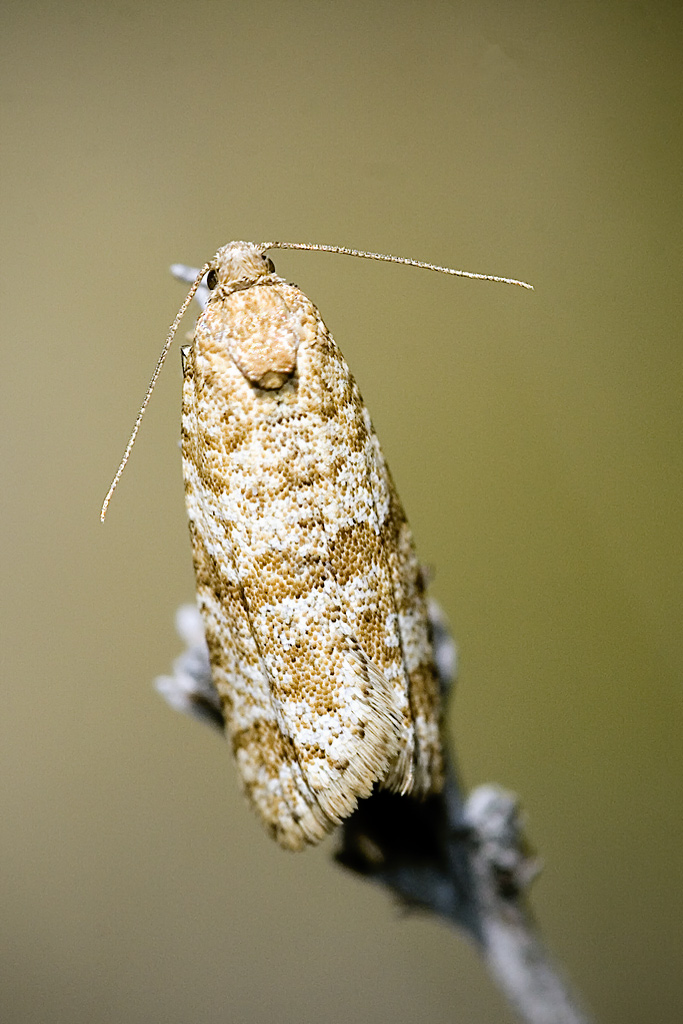
- Isotrias stramentana

Scientific classification
- Kingdom: Animalia
- Phylum: Arthropoda
- Clade: Pancrustacea
- Class: Insecta
- Order: Lepidoptera
- Family: Tortricidae
- Subfamily: Chlidanotinae
- Tribe: Polyorthini; Obraztsov, 1966

Genera
- See text

= Polyorthini =

Tribe of moths

Polyorthini is a tribe of moths in the family Tortricidae.

== Genera ==
Apura
Ardeutica
Biclonuncaria
Chlorortha
Clonuncaria
Cnephasitis
Ebodina
Epelebodina
Histura
Histurodes
Isotrias
Lopharcha
Lophoprora
Lypothora
Olindia
Polylopha
Polyortha
Polythora
†Polyvena
Pseudatteria
Pseuduncifera
Scytalognatha
Sociosa
Thaumatoptila
Xeneboda

== Formerly placed here ==
Macasinia
Orthocomotis
