= Ardeutica mezion =

Scientific classification
- Kingdom: Animalia
- Phylum: Arthropoda
- Class: Insecta
- Order: Lepidoptera
- Family: Tortricidae
- Genus: Ardeutica
- Species: A. mezion

Binomial name
- Ardeutica mezion Razowski, 1984

Species of moth

Ardeutica mezion is a species of moth of the family Tortricidae. It is found on Cuba.
