= Ardeutica tonsilis =

Scientific classification
- Kingdom: Animalia
- Phylum: Arthropoda
- Class: Insecta
- Order: Lepidoptera
- Family: Tortricidae
- Genus: Ardeutica
- Species: A. tonsilis

Binomial name
- Ardeutica tonsilis Razowski, 1984

Species of moth

Ardeutica tonsilis is a species of moth of the family Tortricidae. It is found in Costa Rica.
