= Isotrias penedana =

Scientific classification
- Kingdom: Animalia
- Phylum: Arthropoda
- Clade: Pancrustacea
- Class: Insecta
- Order: Lepidoptera
- Family: Tortricidae
- Genus: Isotrias
- Species: I. penedana

Binomial name
- Isotrias penedana Trematerra, 2013

Species of moth

Isotrias penedana is a species of moth of the family Tortricidae. It is found in the Serra da Peneda in north-western Portugal.

The wingspan is 16–20 mm.

== Etymology ==
The species is named for the Serra da Peneda.
