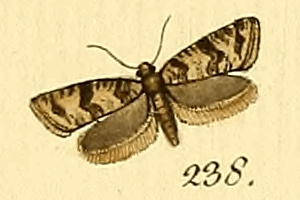

Scientific classification
- Domain: Eukaryota
- Kingdom: Animalia
- Phylum: Arthropoda
- Class: Insecta
- Order: Lepidoptera
- Family: Tortricidae
- Genus: Isotrias
- Species: I. hybridana

Binomial name
- Isotrias hybridana (Hübner, 1817)

= Isotrias hybridana =

Species of moth

Isotrias hybridana is a species of moth of the family Tortricidae. It is found in France, Spain, Portugal, Italy, Germany, Poland, the Czech Republic, Slovakia, Austria, Hungary, Ukraine and most of the Balkan Peninsula.

The wingspan is 12–17 mm. Adults are active during the daytime. There is one generation per year with adults on wing in June and July.

The larvae feed on hawthorn (Crataegus species), Acer and oak (Quercus species).
