= Clonuncaria coronae =

Scientific classification
- Kingdom: Animalia
- Phylum: Arthropoda
- Clade: Pancrustacea
- Class: Insecta
- Order: Lepidoptera
- Family: Tortricidae
- Genus: Clonuncaria
- Species: C. coronae

Binomial name
- Clonuncaria coronae Razowski & Becker, 2011

Species of moth

Clonuncaria coronae is a species of moth of the family Tortricidae. It is found in Minas Gerais, Brazil.

The wingspan is about 11 mm.
