= Isotrias martelliana =

Scientific classification
- Domain: Eukaryota
- Kingdom: Animalia
- Phylum: Arthropoda
- Class: Insecta
- Order: Lepidoptera
- Family: Tortricidae
- Genus: Isotrias
- Species: I. martelliana

Binomial name
- Isotrias martelliana Trematerra, 1990

Species of moth

Isotrias martelliana is a species of moth of the family Tortricidae. It is found in Italy (Monti del Pollino, Cozzi dell’Anticristo).
