= Cnephasitis dryadarcha =

Scientific classification
- Kingdom: Animalia
- Phylum: Arthropoda
- Class: Insecta
- Order: Lepidoptera
- Family: Tortricidae
- Genus: Cnephasitis
- Species: C. dryadarcha

Binomial name
- Cnephasitis dryadarcha (Meyrick, 1912)

Synonyms
- Peronea dryadarcha Meyrick, 1912

Species of moth

Cnephasitis dryadarcha is a species of moth of the family Tortricidae. It is found in India (Assam, Darjeeling, Sikkim, Bengal), north-eastern Burma and Vietnam.
