= Chlorortha chloromonas =

Scientific classification
- Kingdom: Animalia
- Phylum: Arthropoda
- Class: Insecta
- Order: Lepidoptera
- Family: Tortricidae
- Genus: Chlorortha
- Species: C. chloromonas

Binomial name
- Chlorortha chloromonas Razowski, 1984

Species of moth

Chlorortha chloromonas is a species of moth of the family Tortricidae. It is found in Venezuela.
