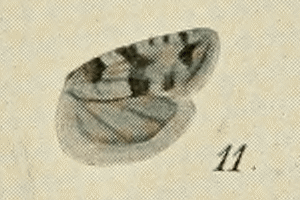

Scientific classification
- Kingdom: Animalia
- Phylum: Arthropoda
- Class: Insecta
- Order: Lepidoptera
- Family: Tortricidae
- Genus: Isotrias
- Species: I. cuencana

Binomial name
- Isotrias cuencana (Kennel, 1899)

Synonyms
- Olindia cuencana Kennel, 1898

= Isotrias cuencana =

Species of moth

Isotrias cuencana is a species of moth of the family Tortricidae. It is found in Spain.

Its wingspan is about 15 mm.
