= Lopharcha iriodis =

Scientific classification
- Domain: Eukaryota
- Kingdom: Animalia
- Phylum: Arthropoda
- Class: Insecta
- Order: Lepidoptera
- Family: Tortricidae
- Genus: Lopharcha
- Species: L. iriodis

Binomial name
- Lopharcha iriodis Diakonoff, 1976

Species of moth

Lopharcha iriodis is a species of moth of the family Tortricidae. It is found in Nepal.
