= Ardeutica semipicta =

Scientific classification
- Kingdom: Animalia
- Phylum: Arthropoda
- Class: Insecta
- Order: Lepidoptera
- Family: Tortricidae
- Genus: Ardeutica
- Species: A. semipicta

Binomial name
- Ardeutica semipicta Meyrick, 1913

Species of moth

Ardeutica semipicta is a species of moth of the family Tortricidae. It is found in Brazil.
