= Histura limosa =

Scientific classification
- Kingdom: Animalia
- Phylum: Arthropoda
- Class: Insecta
- Order: Lepidoptera
- Family: Tortricidae
- Genus: Histura
- Species: H. limosa

Binomial name
- Histura limosa (Meyrick, 1912)

Synonyms
- Peronea limosa Meyrick, 1912

Species of moth

Histura limosa is a species of moth of the family Tortricidae. It is found in Colombia. Its holotype is BMNH.
