= Ardeutica dryocremna =

Scientific classification
- Kingdom: Animalia
- Phylum: Arthropoda
- Class: Insecta
- Order: Lepidoptera
- Family: Tortricidae
- Genus: Ardeutica
- Species: A. dryocremna

Binomial name
- Ardeutica dryocremna (Meyrick, 1932)

Synonyms
- Polyortha dryocremna Meyrick, 1932

Species of moth

Ardeutica dryocremna is a species of moth of the family Tortricidae. It is found in Guatemala.
