= Polylopha cassiicola =

Scientific classification
- Kingdom: Animalia
- Phylum: Arthropoda
- Clade: Pancrustacea
- Class: Insecta
- Order: Lepidoptera
- Family: Tortricidae
- Genus: Polylopha
- Species: P. cassiicola

Binomial name
- Polylopha cassiicola Y.Q. Liu & A. Kawabe, 1993

Species of moth

Polylopha cassiicola is a species of moth of the family Tortricidae. It is found in China (Guangdong and Hong Kong).

The larvae feed on Cinnamomum species.
