= Histura bicornigera =

Scientific classification
- Kingdom: Animalia
- Phylum: Arthropoda
- Class: Insecta
- Order: Lepidoptera
- Family: Tortricidae
- Genus: Histura
- Species: H. bicornigera

Binomial name
- Histura bicornigera Razowski, 1984

Species of moth

Histura bicornigera is a species of moth of the family Tortricidae. It is found in Colombia.
