= Histura hirsuta =

Scientific classification
- Domain: Eukaryota
- Kingdom: Animalia
- Phylum: Arthropoda
- Class: Insecta
- Order: Lepidoptera
- Family: Tortricidae
- Genus: Histura
- Species: H. hirsuta

Binomial name
- Histura hirsuta (Walsingham, 1914)

Synonyms
- Polyortha hirsuta Walsingham, 1914; Histura hirsura Razowski, 1981

Species of moth

Histura hirsuta is a species of moth of the family Tortricidae. It is found in Panama.
