= Histurodes costaricana =

Scientific classification
- Kingdom: Animalia
- Phylum: Arthropoda
- Class: Insecta
- Order: Lepidoptera
- Family: Tortricidae
- Genus: Histurodes
- Species: H. costaricana

Binomial name
- Histurodes costaricana Razowski, 1984

Species of moth

Histurodes costaricana is a species of moth of the family Tortricidae. It is found in Costa Rica.

Larvae have been reared on Persea americana.
