= Polythora viridescens =

Scientific classification
- Kingdom: Animalia
- Phylum: Arthropoda
- Class: Insecta
- Order: Lepidoptera
- Family: Tortricidae
- Genus: Polythora
- Species: P. viridescens

Binomial name
- Polythora viridescens (Meyrick, 1912)

Synonyms
- Peronea viridescens Meyrick, 1912; Polyortha mollinediella Busck, 1932

Species of moth

Polythora viridescens is a species of moth of the family Tortricidae. It is found in Brazil.
