= Lopharcha quinquestriata =

Scientific classification
- Domain: Eukaryota
- Kingdom: Animalia
- Phylum: Arthropoda
- Class: Insecta
- Order: Lepidoptera
- Family: Tortricidae
- Genus: Lopharcha
- Species: L. quinquestriata

Binomial name
- Lopharcha quinquestriata Diakonoff, 1941

Species of moth

Lopharcha quinquestriata is a species of moth of the family Tortricidae. It is found on Java in Indonesia.
