= Lopharcha amethystas =

Scientific classification
- Kingdom: Animalia
- Phylum: Arthropoda
- Class: Insecta
- Order: Lepidoptera
- Family: Tortricidae
- Genus: Lopharcha
- Species: L. amethystas

Binomial name
- Lopharcha amethystas (Meyrick, 1912)

Synonyms
- Peronea amethystas Meyrick, 1912

Species of moth

Lopharcha amethystas is a species of moth of the family Tortricidae. It is found in Assam, India.
