= Isotrias huemeri =

Scientific classification
- Kingdom: Animalia
- Phylum: Arthropoda
- Class: Insecta
- Order: Lepidoptera
- Family: Tortricidae
- Genus: Isotrias
- Species: I. huemeri

Binomial name
- Isotrias huemeri Trematerra, 1993

Species of moth

Isotrias huemeri is a species of moth of the family Tortricidae. It is found on Monti del Pollino in Italy.
