= Cnephasitis sapana =

Scientific classification
- Domain: Eukaryota
- Kingdom: Animalia
- Phylum: Arthropoda
- Class: Insecta
- Order: Lepidoptera
- Family: Tortricidae
- Genus: Cnephasitis
- Species: C. sapana

Binomial name
- Cnephasitis sapana Razowski, 2008

Species of moth

Cnephasitis sapana is a species of moth of the family Tortricidae, described by Józef Razowski in 2008. It is found in northern Vietnam.

The wingspan is about 26 mm.

== Etymology ==
The name refers to the type locality.
