= Clonuncaria melanophyta =

Scientific classification
- Kingdom: Animalia
- Phylum: Arthropoda
- Class: Insecta
- Order: Lepidoptera
- Family: Tortricidae
- Genus: Clonuncaria
- Species: C. melanophyta

Binomial name
- Clonuncaria melanophyta (Meyrick, 1913)

Synonyms
- Argyrotoxa melanophyta Meyrick, 1913

Species of moth

Clonuncaria melanophyta is a species of moth of the family Tortricidae. It is found in Argentina.
