= Biclonuncaria =

Scientific classification
- Kingdom: Animalia
- Phylum: Arthropoda
- Clade: Pancrustacea
- Class: Insecta
- Order: Lepidoptera
- Family: Tortricidae
- Tribe: Polyorthini
- Genus: Biclonuncaria; Razowski & Becker, 1993

Species
- See text

Genus of tortrix moths

Biclonuncaria is a genus of moths belonging to the family Tortricidae.

== Species ==
- Biclonuncaria alota Razowski & Becker, 1993
- Biclonuncaria cerucha Razowski & Becker, 1993
- Biclonuncaria coniata Razowski & Becker, 1993
- Biclonuncaria conica Razowski & Becker, 1993
- Biclonuncaria dalbergiae Razowski & Becker, 1993
- Biclonuncaria deutera Razowski & Becker, 1993
- Biclonuncaria foeda Razowski & Becker, 1993
- Biclonuncaria juanita Razowski & Becker, 1993
- Biclonuncaria parvuncus Razowski & Becker, 2011
- Biclonuncaria phaedroptera Razowski & Becker, 1993
- Biclonuncaria residua Razowski & Becker, 1993
- Biclonuncaria tetrica Razowski & Becker, 1993
