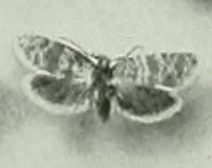

Scientific classification
- Kingdom: Animalia
- Phylum: Arthropoda
- Class: Insecta
- Order: Lepidoptera
- Family: Tortricidae
- Genus: Isotrias
- Species: I. joannisana

Binomial name
- Isotrias joannisana (Turati, 1921)

Synonyms
- Anisotaenia joannisana Turati, 1921

= Isotrias joannisana =

Species of moth

Isotrias joannisana is a species of moth of the family Tortricidae. It is found in central and southern Italy. There are also records for France and Spain.

The wingspan is 16–17 mm.
