= Lophoprora cyanostacta =

Scientific classification
- Kingdom: Animalia
- Phylum: Arthropoda
- Class: Insecta
- Order: Lepidoptera
- Family: Tortricidae
- Genus: Lophoprora
- Species: L. cyanostacta

Binomial name
- Lophoprora cyanostacta Meyrick, 1930

Species of moth

Lophoprora cyanostacta is a species of moth of the family Tortricidae. It is found in New Guinea.
