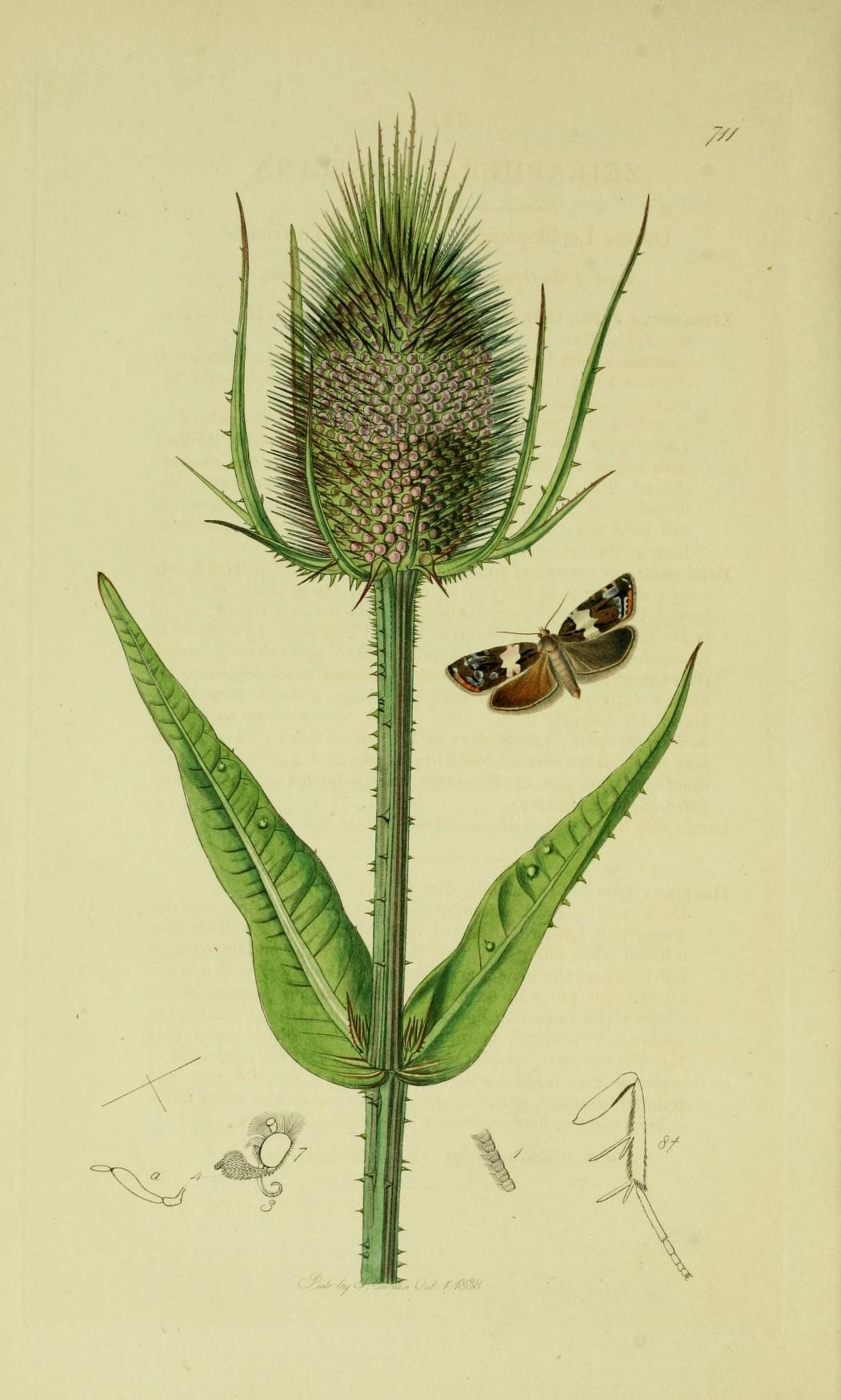
- Illustration from John Curtis's British Entomology Volume 6

Scientific classification
- Domain: Eukaryota
- Kingdom: Animalia
- Phylum: Arthropoda
- Class: Insecta
- Order: Lepidoptera
- Family: Tortricidae
- Genus: Olindia
- Species: O. schumacherana

Binomial name
- Olindia schumacherana (Fabricius, 1787)

Synonyms
- List: Pyralis schumacherana Fabricius, 1787; Tortrix areolana Hubner, [1822-1823]; Anisotaenia schumacherana ab. cruciana Burmann, 1949; Anisotaenia schumacherana ab. obscurana Burmann, 1949; Tortrix ulmana Hubner, [1822-1823]

= Olindia schumacherana =

Species of moth

Olindia schumacherana, also known as the white-barred tortrix, is a moth of the family Tortricidae found in most of Europe. The moth was first described by the Danish zoologist, Johan Christian Fabricius in 1787.

== Description ==
The wingspan is 11–16 mm. It is an easily recognizable species, although its appearance may vary. The wings have a black mingled with dark brown ground colour. Along the dorsal edge there is a slightly more reddish-brown narrow ribbon. In the middle of each wing there is a wide white cross-band.

Adults are on wing in June and July and can be disturbed, although they quickly return to cover. Males fly in the afternoon sunshine, while the females fly after dark.

== Life cycle ==
The larvae feed on various herbaceous plants, folding over a leaf and feeding within. Foodplants include bugle (Ajuga species), Anemone, columbine (Aquilegia vulgaris), golden saxifrage (Chrysosplenium species), celandine (Ficaria verna), yellow archangel (Lamium galeobdolon), dog's mercury (Mercurialis perennis) and bilberry (Vaccinium myrtillus). Pupa can be found in June, in the larval habitation or on the ground in a cocoon.
