= Chlorortha =

Scientific classification
- Kingdom: Animalia
- Phylum: Arthropoda
- Class: Insecta
- Order: Lepidoptera
- Family: Tortricidae
- Tribe: Polyorthini
- Genus: Chlorortha; Razowski, 1984

Species
- See text

Genus of tortrix moths

Chlorortha is a genus of moths belonging to the family Tortricidae.

== Species ==
- Chlorortha chloromonas Razowski, 1984
