= Lopharcha erioptila =

Scientific classification
- Kingdom: Animalia
- Phylum: Arthropoda
- Class: Insecta
- Order: Lepidoptera
- Family: Tortricidae
- Genus: Lopharcha
- Species: L. erioptila

Binomial name
- Lopharcha erioptila (Meyrick, 1912)

Synonyms
- Peronea erioptila Meyrick, 1912; Acleris erioptila Clarke, 1958; Lopharcha erioptila Diakonoff, 1974

Species of moth

Lopharcha erioptila is a species of moth of the family Tortricidae first described by Edward Meyrick in 1912. It is found in Sri Lanka.
