= Biclonuncaria coniata =

Scientific classification
- Kingdom: Animalia
- Phylum: Arthropoda
- Clade: Pancrustacea
- Class: Insecta
- Order: Lepidoptera
- Family: Tortricidae
- Genus: Biclonuncaria
- Species: B. coniata

Binomial name
- Biclonuncaria coniata Razowski & Becker, 1993

Species of moth

Biclonuncaria coniata is a species of moth of the family Tortricidae. It is found in the Federal District of Brazil.
