= Epelebodina =

Scientific classification
- Kingdom: Animalia
- Phylum: Arthropoda
- Class: Insecta
- Order: Lepidoptera
- Family: Tortricidae
- Tribe: Polyorthini
- Genus: Epelebodina; Razowski, 2006

Species
- See text

Genus of tortrix moths

Epelebodina is a genus of moths belonging to the family Tortricidae.

== Species ==
- Epelebodina concolorata Razowski, 2006
