= Histura chlorotypa =

Scientific classification
- Kingdom: Animalia
- Phylum: Arthropoda
- Clade: Pancrustacea
- Class: Insecta
- Order: Lepidoptera
- Family: Tortricidae
- Genus: Histura
- Species: H. chlorotypa

Binomial name
- Histura chlorotypa Razowski & Becker, 1981

Species of moth

Histura chlorotypa is a species of moth of the family Tortricidae. It is found in Paraná, Brazil.
