= Apura xanthosoma =

Scientific classification
- Domain: Eukaryota
- Kingdom: Animalia
- Phylum: Arthropoda
- Class: Insecta
- Order: Lepidoptera
- Family: Tortricidae
- Genus: Apura
- Species: A. xanthosoma

Binomial name
- Apura xanthosoma Turner, 1916

Species of moth

Apura xanthosoma is a species of moth of the family Tortricidae. It is found in Queensland, Australia.

The wingspan is about 20 mm. The forewings are fuscous, mixed with whitish and suffused with ochreous-brown. The hindwings are grey.
