= Histura berylla =

Scientific classification
- Kingdom: Animalia
- Phylum: Arthropoda
- Clade: Pancrustacea
- Class: Insecta
- Order: Lepidoptera
- Family: Tortricidae
- Genus: Histura
- Species: H. berylla

Binomial name
- Histura berylla Razowski & Becker, 2011

Species of moth

Histura berylla is a species of moth of the family Tortricidae. It is found in Veracruz, Mexico.

The wingspan is 10–15 mm.

== Etymology ==
The species name refers to the colouration of the forewing.
