= Lopharcha chalcophanes =

Scientific classification
- Kingdom: Animalia
- Phylum: Arthropoda
- Class: Insecta
- Order: Lepidoptera
- Family: Tortricidae
- Genus: Lopharcha
- Species: L. chalcophanes

Binomial name
- Lopharcha chalcophanes (Meyrick, 1931)

Synonyms
- Peronea chalcophanes Meyrick, 1931; Acleris chalcophanes Clarke, 1958; Lopharcha chalcophanes Diakonoff, 1974

Species of moth

Lopharcha chalcophanes is a species of moth of the family Tortricidae first described by Edward Meyrick in 1931. It is found in India, the Bismarck Islands and Sri Lanka.

The wingspan of the male is 10 mm. Head and thorax darkly infuscated. Forewings oblong and narrow. Forewings light glossy golden ochreous, with brownish-glossy-grey tufts. Two leaden-greyish horizontal patches present. Cilia light ochreous. Hindwing glossy bright golden ochreous.
