= Polylopha oachranta =

Scientific classification
- Domain: Eukaryota
- Kingdom: Animalia
- Phylum: Arthropoda
- Class: Insecta
- Order: Lepidoptera
- Family: Tortricidae
- Genus: Polylopha
- Species: P. oachranta

Binomial name
- Polylopha oachranta Diakonoff, 1974

Species of moth

Polylopha oachranta is a species of moth of the family Tortricidae. It is found on the Mariana Islands in the western North Pacific Ocean.
