= Lopharcha =

Scientific classification
- Domain: Eukaryota
- Kingdom: Animalia
- Phylum: Arthropoda
- Class: Insecta
- Order: Lepidoptera
- Family: Tortricidae
- Tribe: Polyorthini
- Genus: Lopharcha; Diakonoff, 1941

Species
- See text

Synonyms
- Laciniella Dugdale, 1966; Loparcha Kuznetzov, 2000

Genus of tortrix moths

Lopharcha is a genus of moths belonging to the family Tortricidae.

== Species ==
- Lopharcha amethystas Meyrick, 1912
- Lopharcha angustior Diakonoff, 1941
- Lopharcha chalcophanes Meyrick, 1931
- Lopharcha chionea Diakonoff, 1974
- Lopharcha conia Diakonoff, 1983
- Lopharcha cryptacantha Diakonoff, 1974
- Lopharcha curiosa Meyrick, 1908
- Lopharcha deliqua Diakonoff, 1974
- Lopharcha ditissima Diakonoff, 1974
- Lopharcha erioptila Meyrick, 1912
- Lopharcha halidora Meyrick, 1908
- Lopharcha herbaecolor Diakonoff, 1941
- Lopharcha insolita Dugdale, 1966
- Lopharcha iriodis Diakonoff, 1976
- Lopharcha kinokuniana Nasu, 2008
- Lopharcha kopeci Razowski, 1992
- Lopharcha maurognoma Diakonoff, 1974
- Lopharcha moriutii Nasu, 2006
- Lopharcha orthioterma Diakonoff, 1941
- Lopharcha psathyra Diakonoff, 1989
- Lopharcha quinquestriata Diakonoff, 1941
- Lopharcha rapax Meyrick, 1908
- Lopharcha siderota Meyrick, 1918
