= Sociosa nesima =

Scientific classification
- Kingdom: Animalia
- Phylum: Arthropoda
- Clade: Pancrustacea
- Class: Insecta
- Order: Lepidoptera
- Family: Tortricidae
- Genus: Sociosa
- Species: S. nesima

Binomial name
- Sociosa nesima Razowski, 2012

Species of moth

Sociosa nesima is a species of moth of the family Tortricidae that is endemic to Nepal.

The wingspan is about 25 millimetres (0.98 in).

== Etymology ==
The species name refers to the type locality.
