= Lopharcha cryptacantha =

Scientific classification
- Domain: Eukaryota
- Kingdom: Animalia
- Phylum: Arthropoda
- Class: Insecta
- Order: Lepidoptera
- Family: Tortricidae
- Genus: Lopharcha
- Species: L. cryptacantha

Binomial name
- Lopharcha cryptacantha Diakonoff, 1974

Species of moth

Lopharcha cryptacantha is a species of moth of the family Tortricidae. It is found in India.
