= Ardeutica emphantica =

Scientific classification
- Kingdom: Animalia
- Phylum: Arthropoda
- Clade: Pancrustacea
- Class: Insecta
- Order: Lepidoptera
- Family: Tortricidae
- Genus: Ardeutica
- Species: A. emphantica

Binomial name
- Ardeutica emphantica Razowski & Becker, 1981

Species of moth

Ardeutica emphantica is a species of moth of the family Tortricidae. It is found in Paraná, Brazil.
