= Histura =

Scientific classification
- Domain: Eukaryota
- Kingdom: Animalia
- Phylum: Arthropoda
- Class: Insecta
- Order: Lepidoptera
- Family: Tortricidae
- Tribe: Polyorthini
- Genus: Histura; Razowski, 1981

Species
- See text

Genus of tortrix moths

Histura is a genus of moths in the family Tortricidae.

== Species ==
- Histura berylla Razowski & Becker, 2011
- Histura bicornigera Razowski, 1984
- Histura boliviana Razowski, 1984
- Histura brunneotypa Razowski & Pelz, 2007
- Histura chlorotypa Razowski & Becker, 1981
- Histura cuprata Meyrick, 1917
- Histura doriae Razowski & Becker, 1981
- Histura hirsuta Walsingham, 1914
- Histura limosa Meyrick, 1912
- Histura luteochlora Razowski & Becker, 2011
- Histura perseavora J.W. Brown, 2010
- Histura xanthotypa Razowski & Becker, 1981
