= Isotrias buckwelli =

Scientific classification
- Domain: Eukaryota
- Kingdom: Animalia
- Phylum: Arthropoda
- Class: Insecta
- Order: Lepidoptera
- Family: Tortricidae
- Genus: Isotrias
- Species: I. buckwelli

Binomial name
- Isotrias buckwelli (Lucas, 1954)

Synonyms
- Anisotaenia buckwelli Lucas, 1954

Species of moth

Isotrias buckwelli is a species of moth of the family Tortricidae. It is found in Morocco.
