= Clonuncaria =

Scientific classification
- Domain: Eukaryota
- Kingdom: Animalia
- Phylum: Arthropoda
- Class: Insecta
- Order: Lepidoptera
- Family: Tortricidae
- Tribe: Polyorthini
- Genus: Clonuncaria; Razowski, 1999

Species
- See text

Genus of tortrix moths

Clonuncaria is a genus of moths belonging to the family Tortricidae.

== Species ==
- Clonuncaria cimolioptera Razowski, 1999
- Clonuncaria coronae Razowski & Becker, 2011
- Clonuncaria melanophyta Meyrick, 1913
