= Histura cuprata =

Scientific classification
- Kingdom: Animalia
- Phylum: Arthropoda
- Class: Insecta
- Order: Lepidoptera
- Family: Tortricidae
- Genus: Histura
- Species: H. cuprata

Binomial name
- Histura cuprata (Meyrick, 1917)

Synonyms
- Peronea cuprata Meyrick, 1917

Species of moth

Histura cuprata is a species of moth of the family Tortricidae. It is found in Guyana and Brazil (Federal District, Santa Catarina).
