= Ardeutica =

Scientific classification
- Domain: Eukaryota
- Kingdom: Animalia
- Phylum: Arthropoda
- Class: Insecta
- Order: Lepidoptera
- Family: Tortricidae
- Tribe: Polyorthini
- Genus: Ardeutica; Meyrick, 1913

Species
- See text

Genus of tortrix moths

Ardeutica is a genus of moths belonging to the family Tortricidae.

== Species ==
- Ardeutica crypsilitha Meyrick, 1932
- Ardeutica dryocremna Meyrick, 1932
- Ardeutica emphantica Razowski & Becker, 1981
- Ardeutica eupeplana Walsingham, 1914
- Ardeutica melidora Razowski, 1984
- Ardeutica mezion Razowski, 1984
- Ardeutica parmata Razowski, 1984
- Ardeutica patillae Razowski & Becker, 2011
- Ardeutica semipicta Meyrick, 1913
- Ardeutica sphenobathra Meyrick, 1917
- Ardeutica spumosa Meyrick, 1913
- Ardeutica tonsilis Razowski, 1984
