= Ardeutica eupeplana =

Scientific classification
- Domain: Eukaryota
- Kingdom: Animalia
- Phylum: Arthropoda
- Class: Insecta
- Order: Lepidoptera
- Family: Tortricidae
- Genus: Ardeutica
- Species: A. eupeplana

Binomial name
- Ardeutica eupeplana (Walsingham, 1914)

Synonyms
- Polyortha eupeplana Walsingham, 1914; Polyortha fluminana Walsingham, 1914

Species of moth

Ardeutica eupeplana is a species of moth of the family Tortricidae. It is found in Guatemala.
