= Lopharcha maurognoma =

Scientific classification
- Kingdom: Animalia
- Phylum: Arthropoda
- Class: Insecta
- Order: Lepidoptera
- Family: Tortricidae
- Genus: Lopharcha
- Species: L. maurognoma

Binomial name
- Lopharcha maurognoma Diakonoff, 1974

Species of moth

Lopharcha maurognoma is a species of moth of the family Tortricidae. It is found on the D'Entrecasteaux Islands near the eastern tip of New Guinea.
