= Apura xylodryas =

Scientific classification
- Kingdom: Animalia
- Phylum: Arthropoda
- Class: Insecta
- Order: Lepidoptera
- Family: Tortricidae
- Genus: Apura
- Species: A. xylodryas

Binomial name
- Apura xylodryas (Meyrick, 1927)

Synonyms
- Peronea xylodryas Meyrick, 1927

Species of moth

Apura xylodryas is a species of moth of the family Tortricidae. It is found on Samoa.
