= Sociosa macrographa =

Scientific classification
- Kingdom: Animalia
- Phylum: Arthropoda
- Clade: Pancrustacea
- Class: Insecta
- Order: Lepidoptera
- Family: Tortricidae
- Genus: Sociosa
- Species: S. macrographa

Binomial name
- Sociosa macrographa (Diakonoff, 1951)

Synonyms
- Peronea macrographa Diakonoff, 1951

Species of moth

Sociosa macrographa is a species of moth of the family Tortricidae. It is found in Myanmar.
