= Lopharcha siderota =

Scientific classification
- Kingdom: Animalia
- Phylum: Arthropoda
- Class: Insecta
- Order: Lepidoptera
- Family: Tortricidae
- Genus: Lopharcha
- Species: L. siderota

Binomial name
- Lopharcha siderota (Meyrick, 1918)

Synonyms
- Peronea siderota Meyrick, 1918

Species of moth

Lopharcha siderota is a species of moth of the family Tortricidae. It is found in Sri Lanka.
