= Ardeutica patillae =

Scientific classification
- Kingdom: Animalia
- Phylum: Arthropoda
- Clade: Pancrustacea
- Class: Insecta
- Order: Lepidoptera
- Family: Tortricidae
- Genus: Ardeutica
- Species: A. patillae

Binomial name
- Ardeutica patillae Razowski & Becker, 2011

Species of moth

Ardeutica patillae is a species of moth of the family Tortricidae. It is found in Puerto Rico.

The wingspan is about 18 mm.
