= Polylopha =

Scientific classification
- Domain: Eukaryota
- Kingdom: Animalia
- Phylum: Arthropoda
- Class: Insecta
- Order: Lepidoptera
- Family: Tortricidae
- Tribe: Polyorthini
- Genus: Polylopha; Lower, 1901

Species
- See text

Genus of tortrix moths

Polylopha is a genus of moths belonging to the family Tortricidae.

== Species ==
- Polylopha cassiicola Liu & Kawabe, 1993
- Polylopha epidesma Lower, 1901
- Polylopha hypophaea Diakonoff, 1974
- Polylopha oachranta Diakonoff, 1974
- Polylopha ornithopora Diakonoff, 1953
- Polylopha phaeolopha Turner, 1925
- Polylopha sichnostola Diakonoff, 1984
