= Polylopha hypophaea =

Scientific classification
- Domain: Eukaryota
- Kingdom: Animalia
- Phylum: Arthropoda
- Class: Insecta
- Order: Lepidoptera
- Family: Tortricidae
- Genus: Polylopha
- Species: P. hypophaea

Binomial name
- Polylopha hypophaea Diakonoff, 1974

Species of moth

Polylopha hypophaea is a species of moth of the family Tortricidae. It is found on Java in Indonesia.
