= Histura perseavora =

Scientific classification
- Kingdom: Animalia
- Phylum: Arthropoda
- Clade: Pancrustacea
- Class: Insecta
- Order: Lepidoptera
- Family: Tortricidae
- Genus: Histura
- Species: H. perseavora

Binomial name
- Histura perseavora J.W. Brown, 2010

Species of moth

Histura perseavora is a species of moth of the family Tortricidae. It is found in Guatemala.

The length of the forewings is 5–5.5 mm. Full-grown larvae reach a length of 6–7 mm.
