= Cnephasitis =

Scientific classification
- Domain: Eukaryota
- Kingdom: Animalia
- Phylum: Arthropoda
- Class: Insecta
- Order: Lepidoptera
- Family: Tortricidae
- Tribe: Polyorthini
- Genus: Cnephasitis; Razowski, 1965

Species
- See text

Genus of tortrix moths

Cnephasitis is a genus of moths belonging to the family Tortricidae.

== Species ==
- Cnephasitis apodicta Diakonoff, 1974
- Cnephasitis dryadarcha Meyrick, 1912
- Cnephasitis meyi Razowski, 2008
- Cnephasitis sapana Razowski, 2008
- Cnephasitis spinata Liu & Bai, 1986
- Cnephasitis vietnamensis Razowski, 2008
