= Ardeutica melidora =

Scientific classification
- Kingdom: Animalia
- Phylum: Arthropoda
- Class: Insecta
- Order: Lepidoptera
- Family: Tortricidae
- Genus: Ardeutica
- Species: A. melidora

Binomial name
- Ardeutica melidora Razowski, 1984

Species of moth

Ardeutica melidora is a species of moth of the family Tortricidae. It is found on Cuba and the British Virgin Islands.
