= Histura luteochlora =

Scientific classification
- Kingdom: Animalia
- Phylum: Arthropoda
- Clade: Pancrustacea
- Class: Insecta
- Order: Lepidoptera
- Family: Tortricidae
- Genus: Histura
- Species: H. luteochlora

Binomial name
- Histura luteochlora Razowski & Becker, 2011

Species of moth

Histura luteochlora is a species of moth of the family Tortricidae. It is found in the Federal District of Brazil.

The wingspan is about 15 mm.
