= Polylopha phaeolopha =

Scientific classification
- Domain: Eukaryota
- Kingdom: Animalia
- Phylum: Arthropoda
- Class: Insecta
- Order: Lepidoptera
- Family: Tortricidae
- Genus: Polylopha
- Species: P. phaeolopha

Binomial name
- Polylopha phaeolopha (Turner, 1925)

Synonyms
- Colocyttara phaeolopha Turner, 1925; Procoronis capnophanes Turner, 1946

Species of moth

Polylopha phaeolopha is a species of moth of the family Tortricidae. It is found in Queensland, Australia.
