= Ardeutica sphenobathra =

Scientific classification
- Kingdom: Animalia
- Phylum: Arthropoda
- Class: Insecta
- Order: Lepidoptera
- Family: Tortricidae
- Genus: Ardeutica
- Species: A. sphenobathra

Binomial name
- Ardeutica sphenobathra (Meyrick, 1917)

Synonyms
- Peronea sphenobathra Meyrick, 1917

Species of moth

Ardeutica sphenobathra is a species of moth of the family Tortricidae. It is found in Guyana.
