= Clonuncaria cimolioptera =

Scientific classification
- Kingdom: Animalia
- Phylum: Arthropoda
- Class: Insecta
- Order: Lepidoptera
- Family: Tortricidae
- Genus: Clonuncaria
- Species: C. cimolioptera

Binomial name
- Clonuncaria cimolioptera Razowski, 1999

Species of moth

Clonuncaria cimolioptera is a species of moth of the family Tortricidae. It is found in Bolivia.
