= Lopharcha kopeci =

Scientific classification
- Kingdom: Animalia
- Phylum: Arthropoda
- Class: Insecta
- Order: Lepidoptera
- Family: Tortricidae
- Genus: Lopharcha
- Species: L. kopeci

Binomial name
- Lopharcha kopeci Razowski, 1992

Synonyms
- Lopharcha kopeki Razowski, 1992

Species of moth

Lopharcha kopeci is a species of moth of the family Tortricidae. It is found in Vietnam.
