= Cnephasitis spinata =

Scientific classification
- Domain: Eukaryota
- Kingdom: Animalia
- Phylum: Arthropoda
- Class: Insecta
- Order: Lepidoptera
- Family: Tortricidae
- Genus: Cnephasitis
- Species: C. spinata

Binomial name
- Cnephasitis spinata Liu & Bai, 1986

Species of moth

Cnephasitis spinata is a species of moth of the family Tortricidae. It is found in Tibet, China.
