= Histura brunneotypa =

Scientific classification
- Kingdom: Animalia
- Phylum: Arthropoda
- Class: Insecta
- Order: Lepidoptera
- Family: Tortricidae
- Genus: Histura
- Species: H. brunneotypa

Binomial name
- Histura brunneotypa Razowski & Pelz, 2007

Species of moth

Histura brunneotypa is a species of moth of the family Tortricidae. It is found in Argentina.

The wingspan is about 16 mm.
