= Ardeutica parmata =

Scientific classification
- Kingdom: Animalia
- Phylum: Arthropoda
- Class: Insecta
- Order: Lepidoptera
- Family: Tortricidae
- Genus: Ardeutica
- Species: A. parmata

Binomial name
- Ardeutica parmata Razowski, 1984

Species of moth

Ardeutica parmata is a species of moth of the family Tortricidae. It is found in Costa Rica.
