= Polylopha epidesma =

Scientific classification
- Domain: Eukaryota
- Kingdom: Animalia
- Phylum: Arthropoda
- Class: Insecta
- Order: Lepidoptera
- Family: Tortricidae
- Genus: Polylopha
- Species: P. epidesma

Binomial name
- Polylopha epidesma Lower, 1901

Synonyms
- Oxygrapha porpacias Meyrick, 1908; Peronea epidesma Meyrick, 1910; Colocyttara epidesma Turner, 1925

Species of moth

Polylopha epidesma is a species of moth of the family Tortricidae first described by Oswald Bertram Lower in 1901. It is found in India, Sri Lanka and Australia.

The wingspan is about 16 mm. The forewings are ashy-grey whitish, mixed with greenish leaden, and strewn with numerous tufts of ashy-grey scales, which become blackish posteriorly. The hindwings are dark fuscous, but lighter on the basal half. Its larval food plant is Polyalthia longifolia.
