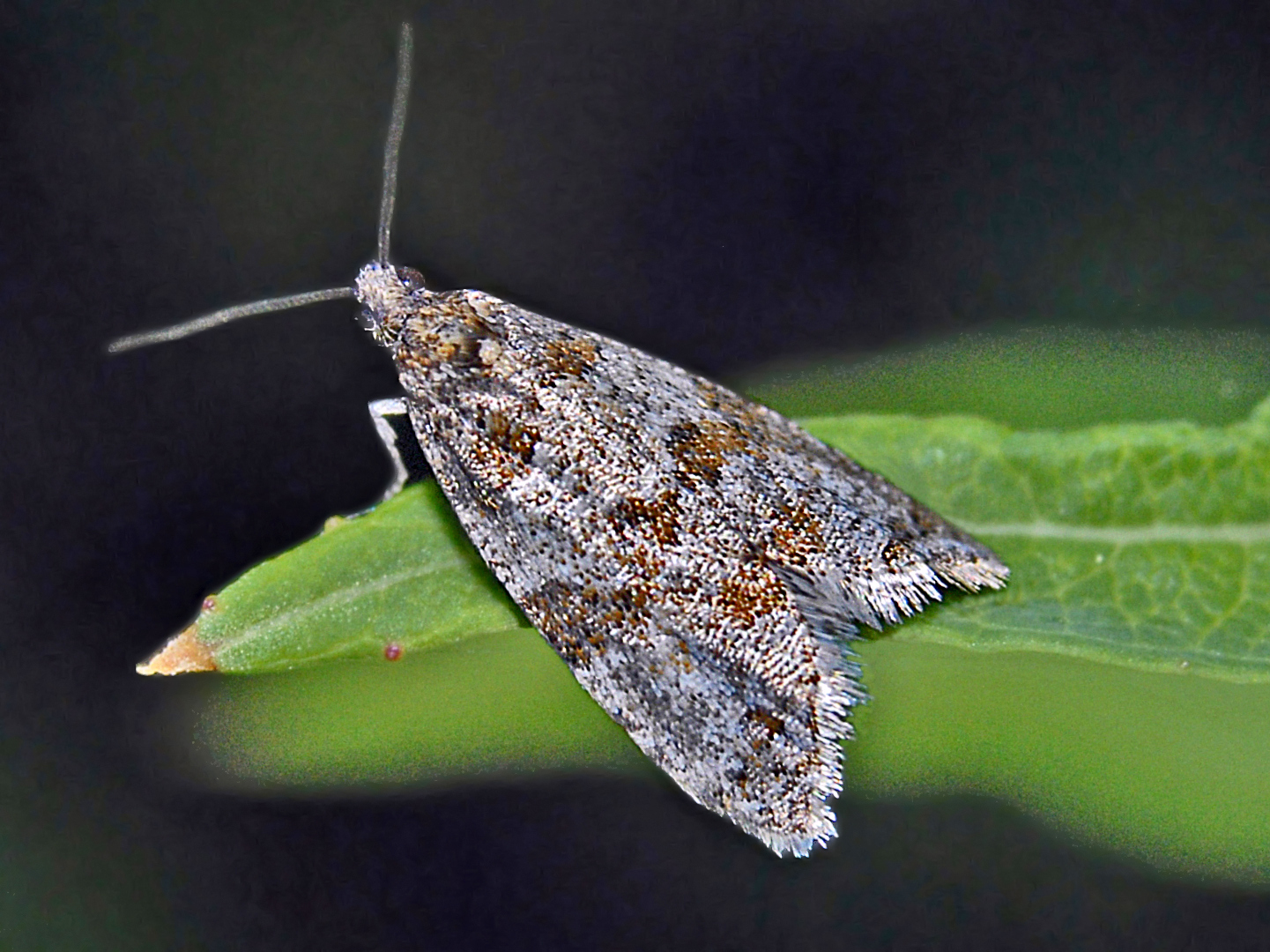
- Isotrias rectifasciana. Dorsal view

Scientific classification
- Domain: Eukaryota
- Kingdom: Animalia
- Phylum: Arthropoda
- Class: Insecta
- Order: Lepidoptera
- Family: Tortricidae
- Genus: Isotrias
- Species: I. rectifasciana

Binomial name
- Isotrias rectifasciana (Haworth, 1811)

Synonyms
- List: Tortrix rectifasciana Haworth, 1811; Sciaphila albulana Treitschke, 1835; Anisotaenia carinthiaca Prohaska, 1922; Cnephasia (Eudemis) curvifasciana Stephens, 1834; Anisotaenia rectifasciana insubrica Müller-Rutz, 1920; Tortrix nemorana Frölich, 1828; Isotrias rectifasciana pseudomodestana Obraztsov, 1957; Phalaena (Tortrix) trifasciana Donovan, [1806]

= Isotrias rectifasciana =

Species of moth

Isotrias rectifasciana, the hedge shade, is a species of moth of the family Tortricidae found in Asia and Europe. The moth was first described by the English entomologist, Adrian Hardy Haworth in 1811.

== Distribution ==
This species can be found in Great Britain, the Benelux, France, Germany, Denmark, Switzerland, Austria, Italy, the Czech Republic, Slovenia, Croatia, Bosnia and Herzegovina, Hungary, Romania and Greece, as well as Turkey and Russia.

== Habitat ==
These moths prefer hedgerows, woodland rides and margins, where hawthorn, oak and other host plants are present, but also it can be found on coastal salt marshes.

== Description ==
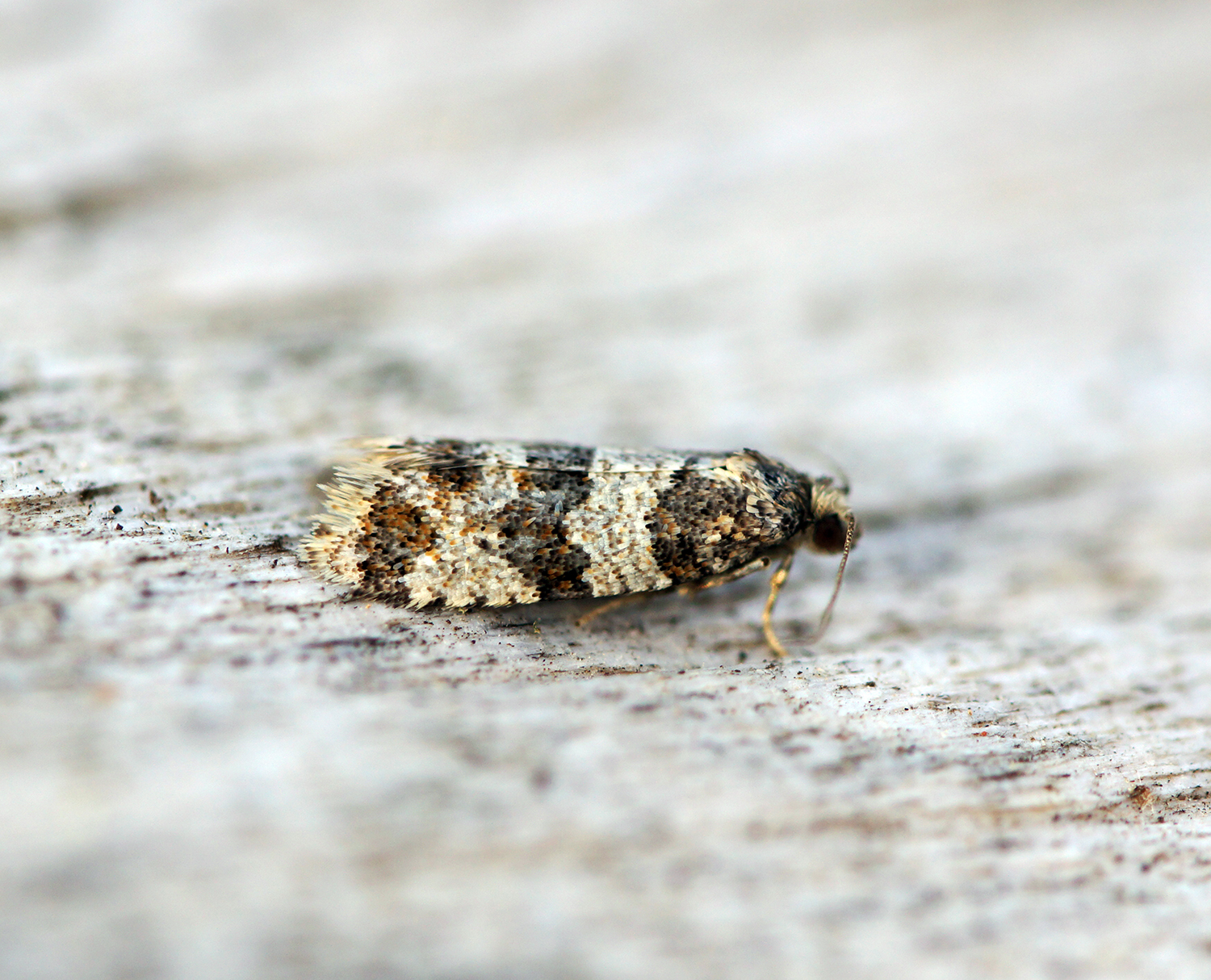
Lateral view

Adults are sexually dimorphic. The wingspan reach 11–14 mm in females, while males have less distinct forewing markings and they are larger, as their wingspan reach 14–16 mm. Forewings are grey-brown, with darker brown transversal markings. This species is quite similar to moths belonging to genus Cnephasia, but the hedge shade has directly transverse dark brown markings.

== Biology ==
Adults are on wing from May to July in one generations per year, flies from dusk onwards and comes to light.

The life-history of this species is imperfectly known but larvae have been reared from, and pupa found on, hawthorn (Crataegus species). Larvae have also been reared on Acer and oak (Quercus species).
