= Lopharcha orthioterma =

Scientific classification
- Domain: Eukaryota
- Kingdom: Animalia
- Phylum: Arthropoda
- Class: Insecta
- Order: Lepidoptera
- Family: Tortricidae
- Genus: Lopharcha
- Species: L. orthioterma

Binomial name
- Lopharcha orthioterma (Diakonoff, 1941)

Synonyms
- Peronea orthioterma Diakonoff, 1941

Species of moth

Lopharcha orthioterma is a species of moth of the family Tortricidae. It is found on Java in Indonesia.
