= Lopharcha herbaecolor =

Scientific classification
- Domain: Eukaryota
- Kingdom: Animalia
- Phylum: Arthropoda
- Class: Insecta
- Order: Lepidoptera
- Family: Tortricidae
- Genus: Lopharcha
- Species: L. herbaecolor

Binomial name
- Lopharcha herbaecolor (Diakonoff, 1941)

Synonyms
- Peronea herbaecolor Diakonoff, 1941

Species of moth

Lopharcha herbaecolor is a species of moth of the family Tortricidae. It is found on Java in Indonesia.
