= Lopharcha kinokuniana =

Scientific classification
- Kingdom: Animalia
- Phylum: Arthropoda
- Class: Insecta
- Order: Lepidoptera
- Family: Tortricidae
- Genus: Lopharcha
- Species: L. kinokuniana

Binomial name
- Lopharcha kinokuniana Nasu, 2008

Species of moth

Lopharcha kinokuniana is a species of moth of the family Tortricidae. It is found in Japan on the island of Honshu.

The wingspan is 11–15 mm.
