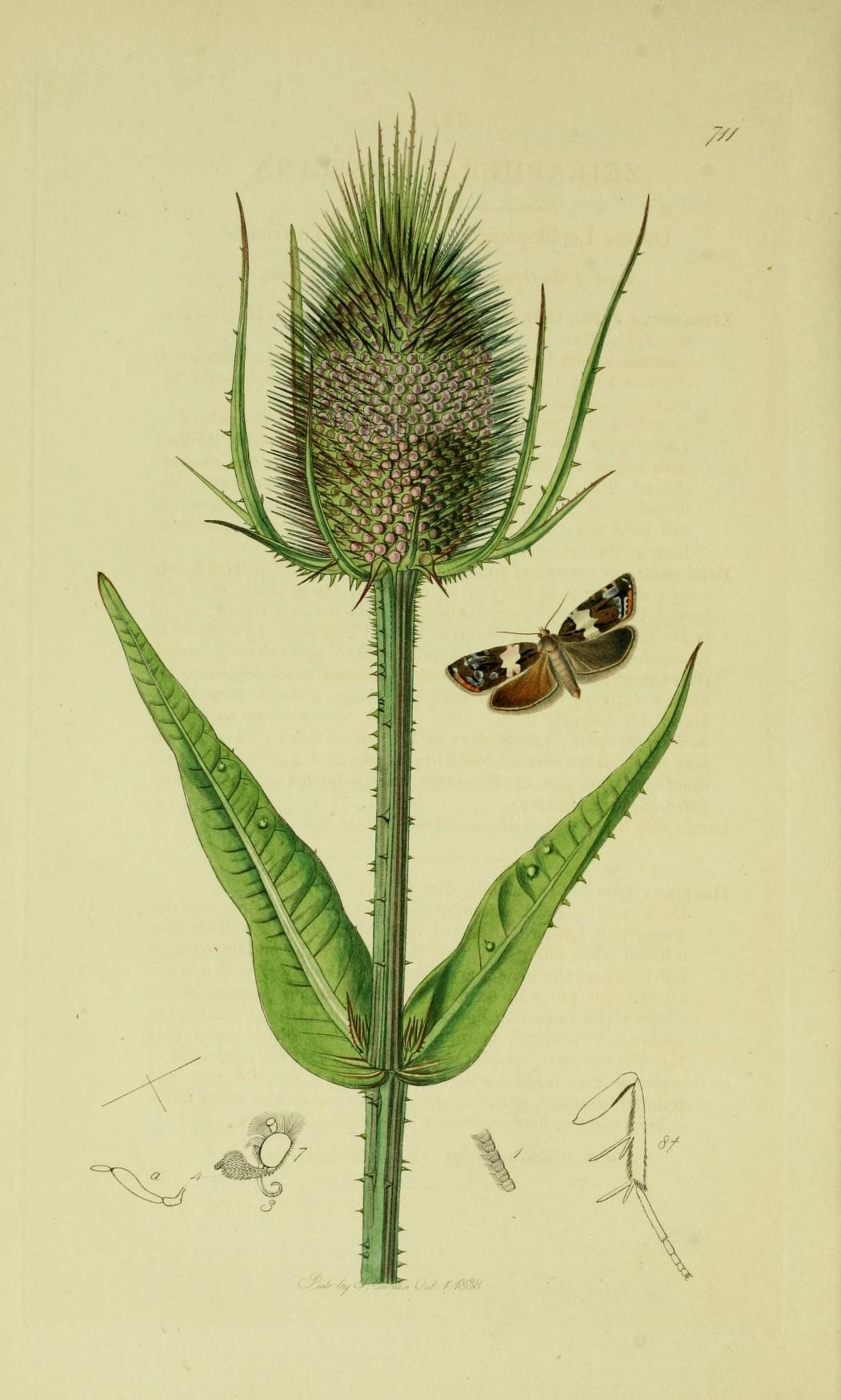
- An illustration from British Entomology by John Curtis. Lepidoptera: Zeiraphera hastiana or Olindia schumacherana

Scientific classification
- Domain: Eukaryota
- Kingdom: Animalia
- Phylum: Arthropoda
- Class: Insecta
- Order: Lepidoptera
- Family: Tortricidae
- Tribe: Polyorthini
- Genus: Olindia; Guenée, 1845

Species
- See text

Synonyms
- Anisotaenia Stephens, 1852; Olinda Lhomme, 1939

= Olindia =

Genus of tortrix moths

Olindia is a genus of moths belonging to the family Tortricidae.

== Species ==
- Olindia schumacherana Fabricius, 1787
