= Thaumatoptila =

Scientific classification
- Kingdom: Animalia
- Phylum: Arthropoda
- Class: Insecta
- Order: Lepidoptera
- Family: Tortricidae
- Tribe: Polyorthini
- Genus: Thaumatoptila; Diakonoff, 1984

Species
- See text

Synonyms
- Thaumatoptyla Diakonoff, 1984

Genus of tortrix moths

Thaumatoptila is a genus of moths belonging to the family Tortricidae.

== Species ==
- Thaumatoptila verrucosa Diakonoff, 1984
