= Pseuduncifera euchlanis =

Scientific classification
- Kingdom: Animalia
- Phylum: Arthropoda
- Class: Insecta
- Order: Lepidoptera
- Family: Tortricidae
- Genus: Pseuduncifera
- Species: P. euchlanis

Binomial name
- Pseuduncifera euchlanis Razowski, 1999

Species of moth

Pseuduncifera euchlanis is a species of moth of the family Tortricidae. It is found in Mexico.
