= Histurodes taetera =

Scientific classification
- Kingdom: Animalia
- Phylum: Arthropoda
- Class: Insecta
- Order: Lepidoptera
- Family: Tortricidae
- Genus: Histurodes
- Species: H. taetera

Binomial name
- Histurodes taetera Razowski, 1984

Species of moth

Histurodes taetera is a species of moth of the family Tortricidae. It is found in Guatemala.
