= Lophoprora =

Scientific classification
- Kingdom: Animalia
- Phylum: Arthropoda
- Class: Insecta
- Order: Lepidoptera
- Family: Tortricidae
- Tribe: Polyorthini
- Genus: Lophoprora; Meyrick, 1930

Species
- See text

Synonyms
- Lophopropa Razowski, 1977

Genus of tortrix moths

Lophoprora is a genus of moths belonging to the family Tortricidae.

== Species ==
- Lophoprora cyanostacta Meyrick, 1930
