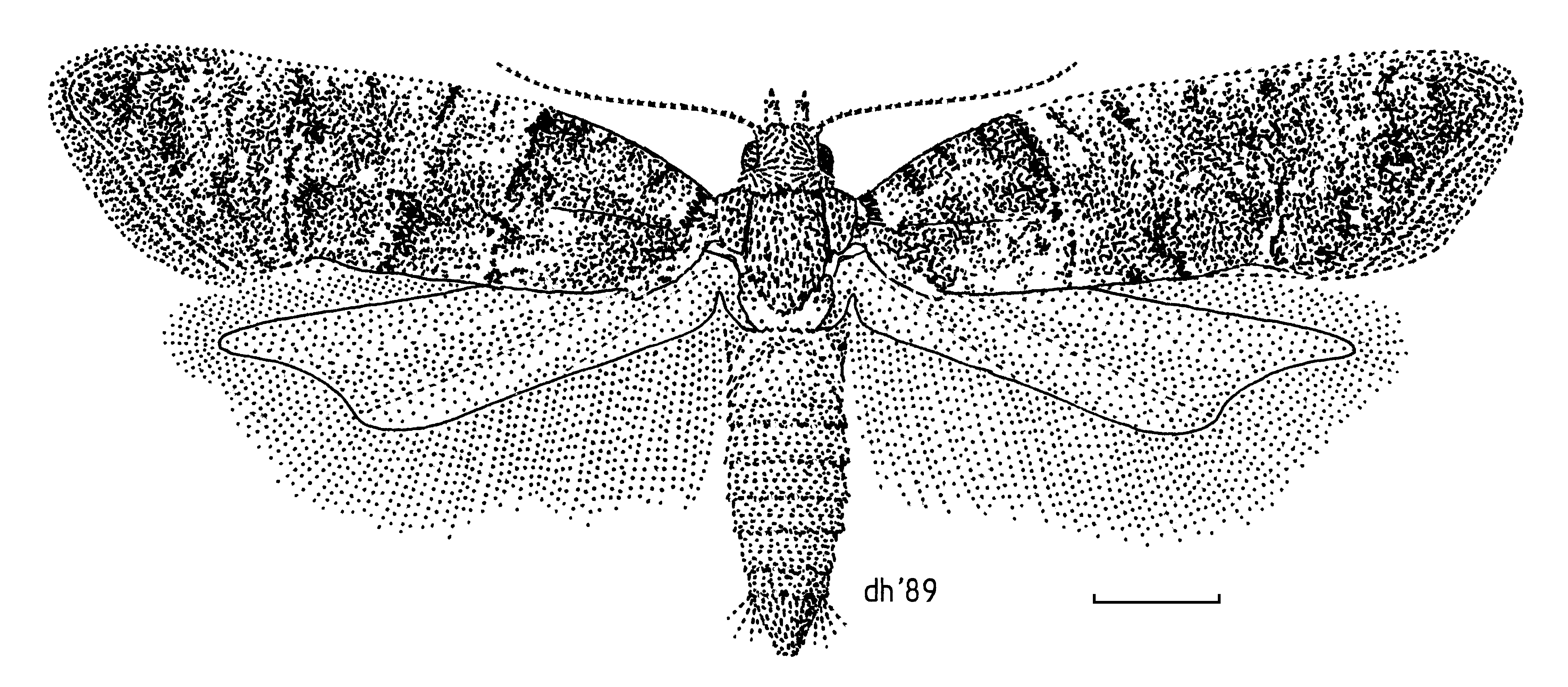
- Illustration by Des Helmore

Scientific classification
- Domain: Eukaryota
- Kingdom: Animalia
- Phylum: Arthropoda
- Class: Insecta
- Order: Lepidoptera
- Family: Tortricidae
- Genus: Lopharcha
- Species: L. insolita

Binomial name
- Lopharcha insolita (Dugdale, 1966)

Synonyms
- Laciniella insolita Dugdale, 1966

= Lopharcha insolita =

Species of moth

Lopharcha insolita is a species of moth of the family Tortricidae. It is found in New Zealand.
