= Scytalognatha abluta =

Scientific classification
- Kingdom: Animalia
- Phylum: Arthropoda
- Class: Insecta
- Order: Lepidoptera
- Family: Tortricidae
- Genus: Scytalognatha
- Species: S. abluta

Binomial name
- Scytalognatha abluta Diakonoff, 1956

Species of moth

Scytalognatha abluta is a species of moth of the family Tortricidae. It is found in New Guinea.
