= Cnephasitis apodicta =

Scientific classification
- Domain: Eukaryota
- Kingdom: Animalia
- Phylum: Arthropoda
- Class: Insecta
- Order: Lepidoptera
- Family: Tortricidae
- Genus: Cnephasitis
- Species: C. apodicta

Binomial name
- Cnephasitis apodicta Diakonoff, 1974

Species of moth

Cnephasitis apodicta is a species of moth of the family Tortricidae. It is found in Burma and Shanxi, China.

== Subspecies ==
- Cnephasitis apodicta apodicta (Upper Burma)
- Cnephasitis apodicta palaearctica Razowski, 1984 (China: Shanxi)
