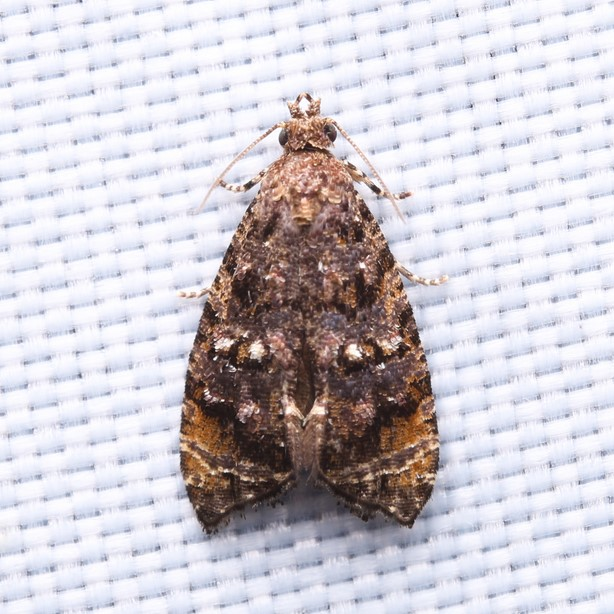

Scientific classification
- Kingdom: Animalia
- Phylum: Arthropoda
- Clade: Pancrustacea
- Class: Insecta
- Order: Lepidoptera
- Family: Tortricidae
- Genus: Lopharcha
- Species: L. moriutii

Binomial name
- Lopharcha moriutii Nasu, 2006

= Lopharcha moriutii =

Species of moth

Lopharcha moriutii is a species of moth in the family Tortricidae. It is found in Thailand and China (Hong Kong).
