= Lopharcha rapax =

Scientific classification
- Kingdom: Animalia
- Phylum: Arthropoda
- Class: Insecta
- Order: Lepidoptera
- Family: Tortricidae
- Genus: Lopharcha
- Species: L. rapax

Binomial name
- Lopharcha rapax (Meyrick, 1908)

Synonyms
- Oxygrapha rapax Meyrick, 1908

Species of moth

Lopharcha rapax is a species of moth of the family Tortricidae. It is found in Sri Lanka.
