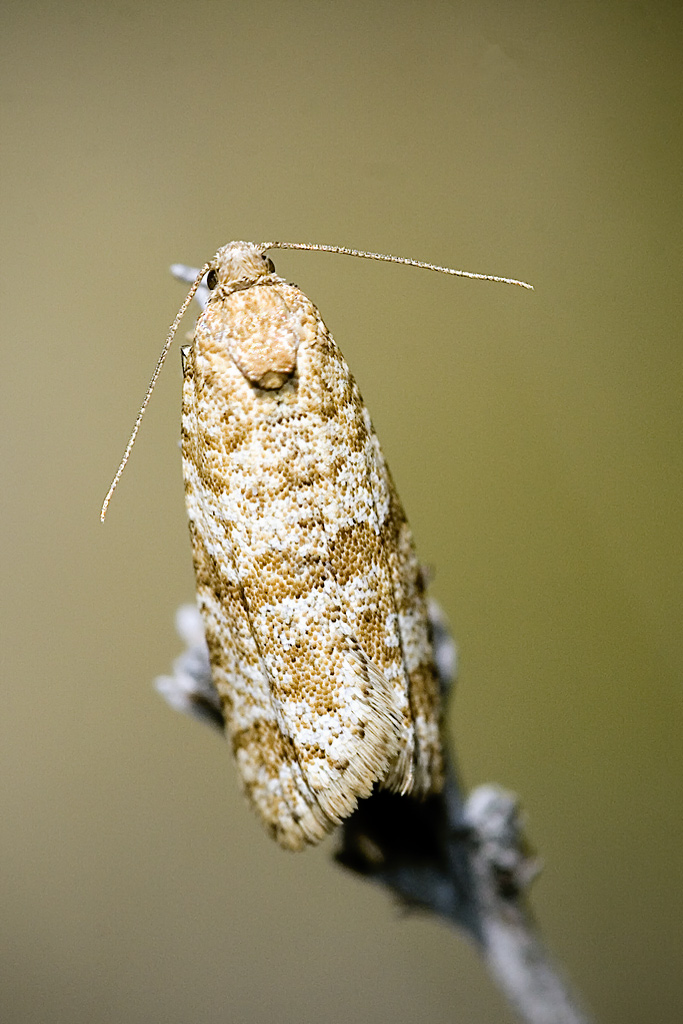
- Isotrias stramentana

Scientific classification
- Domain: Eukaryota
- Kingdom: Animalia
- Phylum: Arthropoda
- Class: Insecta
- Order: Lepidoptera
- Family: Tortricidae
- Tribe: Polyorthini
- Genus: Isotrias; Meyrick, 1895

Species
- See text

= Isotrias =

Genus of tortrix moths

Isotrias is a genus of moths belonging to the family Tortricidae.

== Species ==
- Isotrias buckwelli Lucas, 1954
- Isotrias cuencana Kennel, 1899
- Isotrias huemeri Trematerra, 1993
- Isotrias hybridana (Hübner, 1817)
- Isotrias joannisana Turati, 1921
- Isotrias martelliana Trematerra, 1990
- Isotrias penedana Trematerra, 2013
- Isotrias rectifasciana (Haworth, 1811)
- Isotrias stramentana Guenee, 1845
