= Polythora =

Scientific classification
- Kingdom: Animalia
- Phylum: Arthropoda
- Class: Insecta
- Order: Lepidoptera
- Family: Tortricidae
- Tribe: Polyorthini
- Genus: Polythora; Razowski, 1981

Genus of tortrix moths

Polythora is a genus of moths belonging to the family Tortricidae.

== Species ==
- Polythora viridescens (Meyrick, 1912)

== See also ==
- List of Tortricidae genera
