= Cnephasitis vietnamensis =

Scientific classification
- Kingdom: Animalia
- Phylum: Arthropoda
- Class: Insecta
- Order: Lepidoptera
- Family: Tortricidae
- Genus: Cnephasitis
- Species: C. vietnamensis

Binomial name
- Cnephasitis vietnamensis Razowski, 2008

Species of moth

Cnephasitis vietnamensis is a species of moth of the family Tortricidae. It is found in northern Vietnam.

The wingspan is about 26 mm for males and 29 mm for females.

== Etymology ==
The name refers to the country of origin, Vietnam.
