= Cnephasitis meyi =

Scientific classification
- Kingdom: Animalia
- Phylum: Arthropoda
- Class: Insecta
- Order: Lepidoptera
- Family: Tortricidae
- Genus: Cnephasitis
- Species: C. meyi

Binomial name
- Cnephasitis meyi Razowski, 2008

Species of moth

Cnephasitis meyi is a species of moth of the family Tortricidae. It is found in northern Vietnam. The habitat consists of primary cloud forests.

The wingspan is about 24 mm for males and 28 mm for females. Adults have been recorded on wing in October and November.

== Etymology ==
The species is named in honour of Dr. Wolfram Mey.
