= Polylopha sichnostola =

Scientific classification
- Domain: Eukaryota
- Kingdom: Animalia
- Phylum: Arthropoda
- Class: Insecta
- Order: Lepidoptera
- Family: Tortricidae
- Genus: Polylopha
- Species: P. sichnostola

Binomial name
- Polylopha sichnostola Diakonoff, 1984

Species of moth

Polylopha sichnostola is a species of moth of the family Tortricidae. It is found on Sumba in eastern Indonesia.
