= Polylopha ornithopora =

Scientific classification
- Domain: Eukaryota
- Kingdom: Animalia
- Phylum: Arthropoda
- Class: Insecta
- Order: Lepidoptera
- Family: Tortricidae
- Genus: Polylopha
- Species: P. ornithopora

Binomial name
- Polylopha ornithopora Diakonoff, 1953

Species of moth

Polylopha ornithopora is a species of moth of the family Tortricidae. It is found in New Guinea.
