= Sociosa =

Scientific classification
- Kingdom: Animalia
- Phylum: Arthropoda
- Clade: Pancrustacea
- Class: Insecta
- Order: Lepidoptera
- Family: Tortricidae
- Tribe: Polyorthini
- Genus: Sociosa; Diakonoff, 1959

Genus of tortrix moths

Sociosa is a genus of moths belonging to the subfamily Tortricinae of the family Tortricidae.

== Species ==
- Sociosa macrographa (Diakonoff, 1951)
- Sociosa nesima Razowski, 2012

== See also ==
- List of Tortricidae genera
