= Thaumatoptila verrucosa =

Scientific classification
- Kingdom: Animalia
- Phylum: Arthropoda
- Class: Insecta
- Order: Lepidoptera
- Family: Tortricidae
- Genus: Thaumatoptila
- Species: T. verrucosa

Binomial name
- Thaumatoptila verrucosa Diakonoff, 1984

Species of moth

Thaumatoptila verrucosa is a species of moth of the family Tortricidae. It is found on Sumba in eastern Indonesia.
