= Lopharcha angustior =

Scientific classification
- Domain: Eukaryota
- Kingdom: Animalia
- Phylum: Arthropoda
- Class: Insecta
- Order: Lepidoptera
- Family: Tortricidae
- Genus: Lopharcha
- Species: L. angustior

Binomial name
- Lopharcha angustior (Diakonoff, 1941)

Synonyms
- Peronea angustior Diakonoff, 1941

Species of moth

Lopharcha angustior is a moth of the family Tortricidae. It is found in eastern Java and Taiwan.
