= Lopharcha psathyra =

Scientific classification
- Domain: Eukaryota
- Kingdom: Animalia
- Phylum: Arthropoda
- Class: Insecta
- Order: Lepidoptera
- Family: Tortricidae
- Genus: Lopharcha
- Species: L. psathyra

Binomial name
- Lopharcha psathyra Diakonoff, 1989

Species of moth

Lopharcha psathyra is a species of moth of the family Tortricidae. It is found in Japan on the islands of Kyushu, Honshu and Shikoku.

There are at least two generations per year with adults on wing from late April to mid-June and from mid-July to September.

Full-grown larvae reach a length of about 13 mm. Pupation takes place in a cocoon.
