= Epelebodina concolorata =

Scientific classification
- Kingdom: Animalia
- Phylum: Arthropoda
- Class: Insecta
- Order: Lepidoptera
- Family: Tortricidae
- Genus: Epelebodina
- Species: E. concolorata

Binomial name
- Epelebodina concolorata Razowski, 2006

Species of moth

Epelebodina concolorata is a species of moth of the family Tortricidae. It is found in India (Jammu and Kashmir).

The wingspan is about 16 millimetres (0.63 in).
