= Apura (moth) =

Scientific classification
- Domain: Eukaryota
- Kingdom: Animalia
- Phylum: Arthropoda
- Class: Insecta
- Order: Lepidoptera
- Family: Tortricidae
- Subfamily: Chlidanotinae
- Genus: Apura; Turner, 1916

Species
- See text

Genus of tortrix moths

Apura is a genus of moths belonging to the family Tortricidae.

== Species ==
- Apura xanthosoma Turner, 1916
- Apura xylodryas Meyrick, 1927
