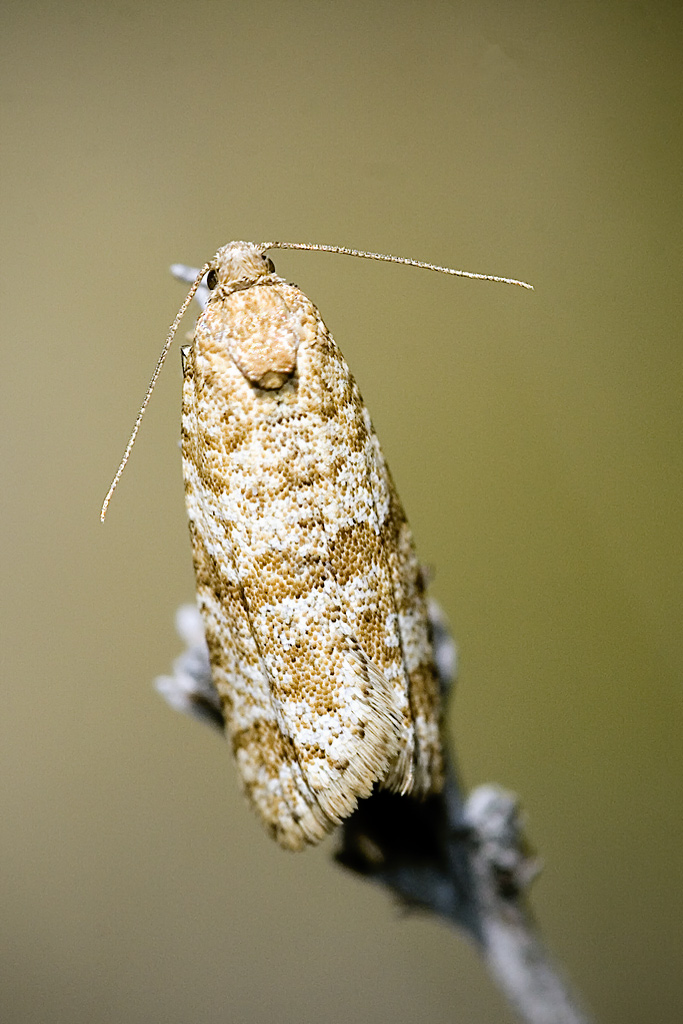

Scientific classification
- Domain: Eukaryota
- Kingdom: Animalia
- Phylum: Arthropoda
- Class: Insecta
- Order: Lepidoptera
- Family: Tortricidae
- Genus: Isotrias
- Species: I. stramentana

Binomial name
- Isotrias stramentana (Guenee, 1845)

Synonyms
- Sciaphila stramentana Guenee, 1845

= Isotrias stramentana =

Species of moth

Isotrias stramentana is a species of moth in the family Tortricidae. It is found in Spain, France, Italy, Switzerland and Germany.

The wingspan is 14–17 mm. Adults are on wing from May to July and again in September.
