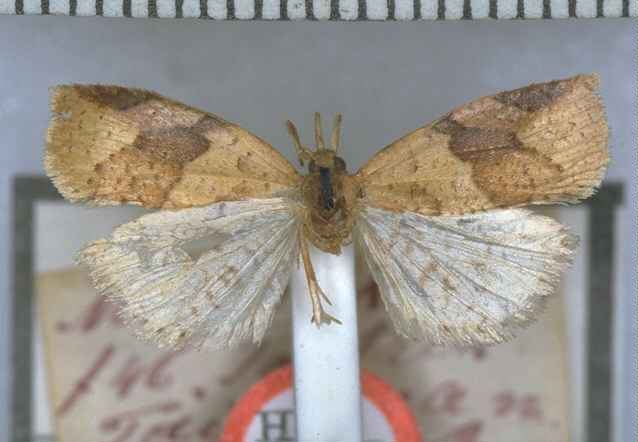
- Male holotype

Scientific classification
- Domain: Eukaryota
- Kingdom: Animalia
- Phylum: Arthropoda
- Class: Insecta
- Order: Lepidoptera
- Family: Tortricidae
- Genus: Apoctena
- Species: A. taipana

Binomial name
- Apoctena taipana (Felder & Rogenhofer, 1875)

Synonyms
- Tortrix taipana Felder & Rogenhofer, 1875; Cacoecia enoplana Meyrick, 1882; Planotortrix taipana (Felder & Rogenhofer, 1875)

= Apoctena taipana =

Species of moth

Apoctena taipana is a species of moth of the family Tortricidae. It is endemic to New Zealand and has been observed in both the North and South Islands. The larvae created a silken tube in which they hide and also use to travel from leaf to leaf. They tunnel into the leaves of their host. Larvae can be found from June to August. Adult moths can be seen on the wing from October to January.

== Taxonomy ==
This species was first described by Cajetan von Felder and Alois Friedrich Rogenhofer in 1875 using a specimen collected in Nelson by T. R. Oxley and named Tortrix taipana. In 1882 Edward Meyrick, thinking he was describing a new species, named this species Cacoecia enoplana. Meyrick synonymised C. enoplana with Tortrix conditana in 1911. In 1988 John S. Dugdale discussed this species under the name Planotortrix taipana. Dugdale examined the male genitalia of the type specimen of C. enoplana and based on this stated it was a synonym of Planotortrix taipana. In 1990 Dugdale placed this species in the genus Apoctena. Dugdale stated that further work was needed on this species as in his view it was possible that A. spatiosa and A. conditana were synonymous with A. taipana. The male holotype specimen is held at the Natural History Museum, London.

== Description ==
The larva of this species are coloured a greenish-yellow and when mature are 25 mm long. When it is ready to pupate the larva joins leaves of its host plant together and then forms its pupa inside.

Meyrick described C. enoplana, the synonym of this species, as follows:

Male. — 20 mm. Head, antennae, thorax, abdomen, and legs whitish-brown; (palpi broken); anterior and middle tibiae and tarsi suffused with dark fuscous except at apex of joints. Forewings moderate, posteriorly dilated, costa moderately arched, hindmargin sinuate, hardly oblique; light dull brown; costal edge and fold dark fuscous; outer edge of basal patch indicated by an irregular dark fuscous line from 1/4 of costa to 1/3 of inner margin; central fascia dark fuscous towards costa, towards inner margin hardly darker than ground-colour, but margined by dark fuscous lines, running from before middle of costa to before anal angle, very narrow on costa, gradually dilating to middle, very broad on lower half, margins rather irregular; a fiattened-triangular dark fuscous spot on costa about 3/4 : cilia light brown, with a darker basal line. Hindwing grey-whitish, very slightly ochreous-tinged, thinly spotted with grey; cilia whitish, spotted with grey at base.

This species is similar in appearance to A. conditana.

== Distribution ==
This species is endemic to New Zealand. Other than in the type locality of Nelson, species has been observed in Banks Peninsula, Otago and Invercargill. This species, as currently described, has also been observed in Wellington (as C. enoplana) and in Kuratau, near Lake Taupo. A. taipana is regarded as being uncommon.

== Habitat ==
This species inhabits native forest.

== Behaviour ==
The larvae created a silken tube in which they hide and also use to travel from leaf to leaf. They mine the leaves of their host. Larvae can be found from June to August. Adult moths can be seen on the wing from October to January.

== Host species ==
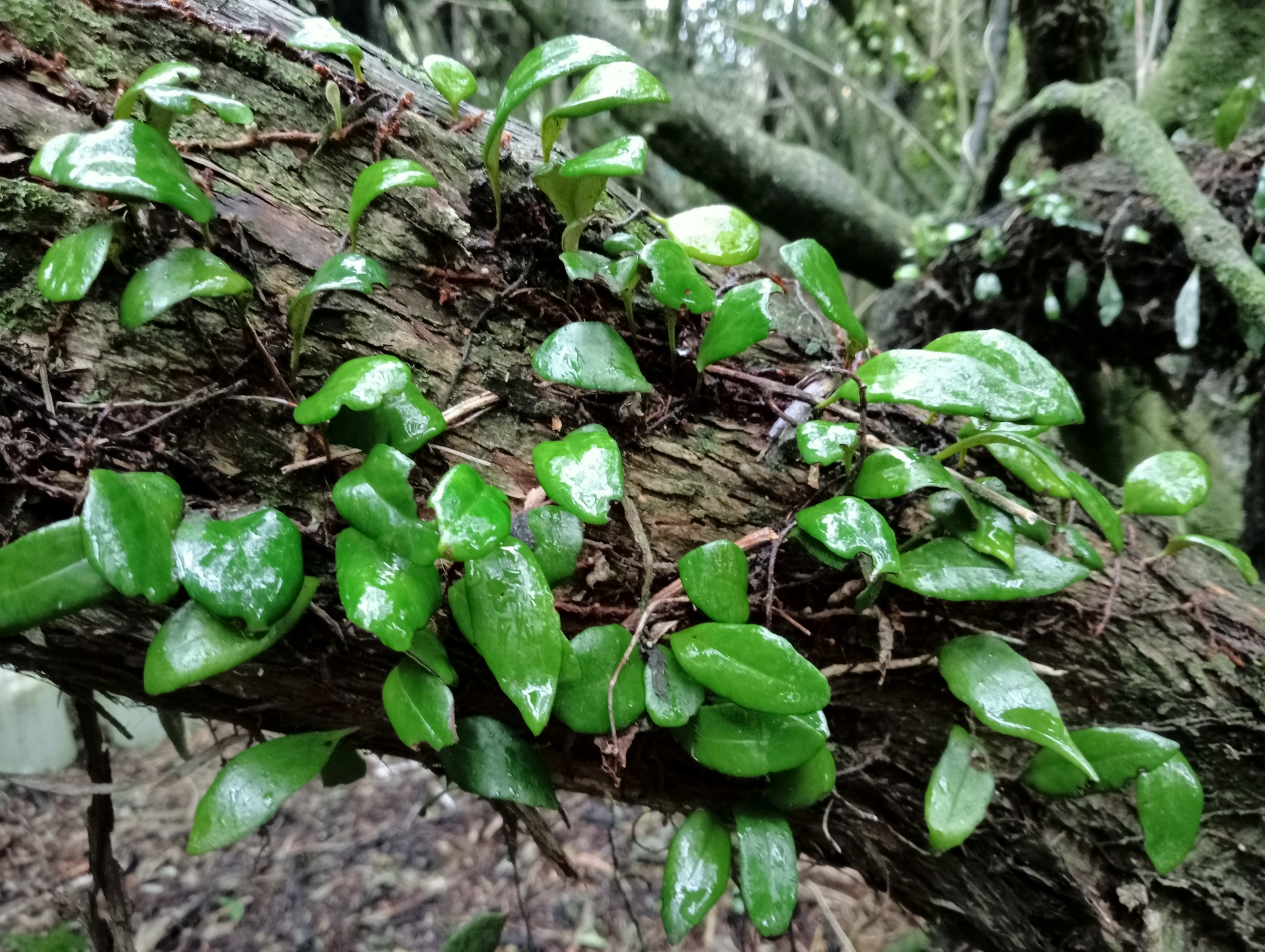
Larval host species Pyrrosia eleagnifolia.

The larval hosts of this species include the fern Pyrrosia eleagnifolia.
