= Goboea =

Scientific classification
- Kingdom: Animalia
- Phylum: Arthropoda
- Class: Insecta
- Order: Lepidoptera
- Family: Tortricidae
- Tribe: Epitymbiini
- Genus: Goboea; Walker, 1866

Genus of tortrix moths

Goboea is a genus of moths belonging to the family Tortricidae.

== Species ==
- Goboea copiosana Walker, 1866

== See also ==
- List of Tortricidae genera
