= Capnoptycha ipnitis =

Scientific classification
- Kingdom: Animalia
- Phylum: Arthropoda
- Class: Insecta
- Order: Lepidoptera
- Family: Tortricidae
- Genus: Capnoptycha
- Species: C. ipnitis

Binomial name
- Capnoptycha ipnitis (Meyrick, 1910)

Synonyms
- Drachmobola ipnitis Meyrick, 1910; Dichelopa ipnitis; Batodes ochrochyta Turner, 1916; Dicellitis theticophara Turner, 1925; Batodes nimbifera Turner, 1945; Acroclita albifusa Turner, 1946; Acroclita atacta Turner, 1946

Species of moth

Capnoptycha ipnitis is a species of moth of the family Tortricidae. It is found in Australia, where it has been recorded from Queensland and New South Wales.

The wingspan is about 12 mm. The forewings are fuscous, the median area suffused with whitish. There is a fuscous basal patch, containing several fine dark-fuscous transverse lines. The hindwings are grey.
