= Trychnophylla =

Scientific classification
- Kingdom: Animalia
- Phylum: Arthropoda
- Class: Insecta
- Order: Lepidoptera
- Family: Tortricidae
- Tribe: Epitymbiini
- Genus: Trychnophylla; Turner, 1926

Genus of tortrix moths

Trychnophylla is a genus of moths belonging to the subfamily Tortricinae of the family Tortricidae.

== Species ==
- Trychnophylla taractica Turner, 1926

== See also ==
- List of Tortricidae genera
