= Aplastoceros =

Scientific classification
- Kingdom: Animalia
- Phylum: Arthropoda
- Class: Insecta
- Order: Lepidoptera
- Family: Tortricidae
- Tribe: Epitymbiini
- Genus: Aplastoceros; Diakonoff, 1953

Genus of tortrix moths

Aplastoceros is a genus of moths belonging to the subfamily Tortricinae of the family Tortricidae.

== Species ==
- Aplastoceros affabilis Diakonoff, 1956
- Aplastoceros carphalea Diakonoff, 1953
- Aplastoceros dentifera Diakonoff, 1953
- Aplastoceros euetrias Diakonoff, 1953
- Aplastoceros peneploca Diakonoff, 1953
- Aplastoceros plumbata Diakonoff, 1953

== See also ==
- List of Tortricidae genera
