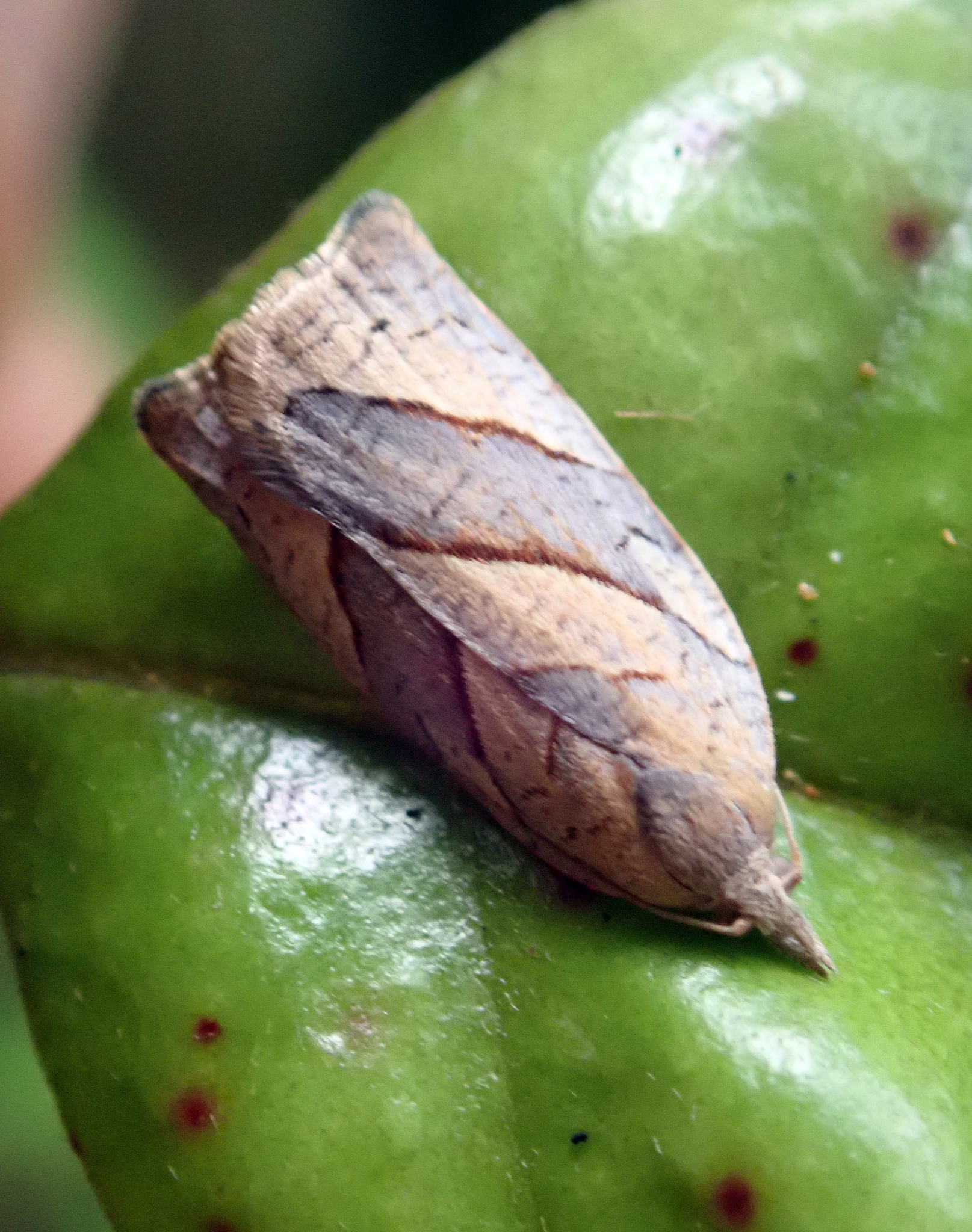

Scientific classification
- Kingdom: Animalia
- Phylum: Arthropoda
- Class: Insecta
- Order: Lepidoptera
- Family: Tortricidae
- Genus: Apoctena
- Species: A. orthocopa

Binomial name
- Apoctena orthocopa (Meyrick, 1924)

Synonyms
- Tortrix orthocopa Meyrick, 1924

= Apoctena orthocopa =

Species of moth

Apoctena orthocopa, also known as striped ponga leaf-tyer, is a species of moth of the family Tortricidae. It is endemic to New Zealand, where it is found only on the North Island.

== Taxonomy ==
This species was first described by Edward Meyrick in 1924 and named Tortrix orthocopa. The specimens used by Meyrick were collected by George Hudson in Wellington in January.

== Description ==
The larvae of this species are pale green with a brown head and when mature are up to 20 mm in length.

Meyrick described the adults of this species as follows:

♂♀. 18–21 mm. Head, palpi, thorax whitish-ochreous. Forewings sub-oblong, costa in ♂ with moderate fold from base to 2/5, termen sinuate, hardly oblique; pale ochreous, sometimes tinged brownish; markings variably tinged lilac and edged with dark-brown streaks; edge of basal patch very oblique, on costal half obsolete; edges of central fascia nearly straight, very oblique, anterior from 1/4 of costa to 3/4 of dorsum, posterior from beyond middle of costa to termen above tornus, sometimes a lighter spot edged posteriorly with one or two dark strigulae occupying anterior part of central fascia on costa; costal spot very faint, edged anteriorly by a very oblique brown striga, sometimes faintly continued sinuate to middle of termen: cilia pale ochreous, two brownish lines more or less marked. Hingwings, ♂ whitish-grey, ♀ ochreous-grey-whitish, a very few small cloudy greyish flecks; cilia concolorous.

== Distribution ==
This species is endemic to New Zealand and is found in the North Island.

== Behaviour ==
The larva of this species fold the fronds of its host and tie them with silk creating a shelter in which to hide. The adult of this species is on the wing from January to March.

== Host plant ==
The larvae feed on Cyathea species including the silver fern.
