= Cleptacaca =

Scientific classification
- Kingdom: Animalia
- Phylum: Arthropoda
- Class: Insecta
- Order: Lepidoptera
- Family: Tortricidae
- Tribe: Epitymbiini
- Genus: Cleptacaca; Diakonoff, 1953

Genus of tortrix moths

Cleptacaca is a genus of moths belonging to the subfamily Tortricinae of the family Tortricidae.

== Species ==
- Cleptacaca tryphera Diakonoff, 1953

== See also ==
- List of Tortricidae genera
