= Anisogona =

Scientific classification
- Kingdom: Animalia
- Phylum: Arthropoda
- Class: Insecta
- Order: Lepidoptera
- Family: Tortricidae
- Tribe: Epitymbiini
- Genus: Anisogona; Meyrick, 1881

Genus of tortrix moths

Anisogona is a genus of moths belonging to the subfamily Tortricinae of the family Tortricidae.

== Species ==
- Anisogona hilaomorpha (Turner, 1926)
- Anisogona mediana (Walker, 1863)
- Anisogona notoplaga (Turner, 1945)
- Anisogona simana (Meyrick, 1881)
- Anisogona similana (Walker, 1863)
- Anisogona thysanoma (Meyrick, 1910)

== See also ==
- List of Tortricidae genera
