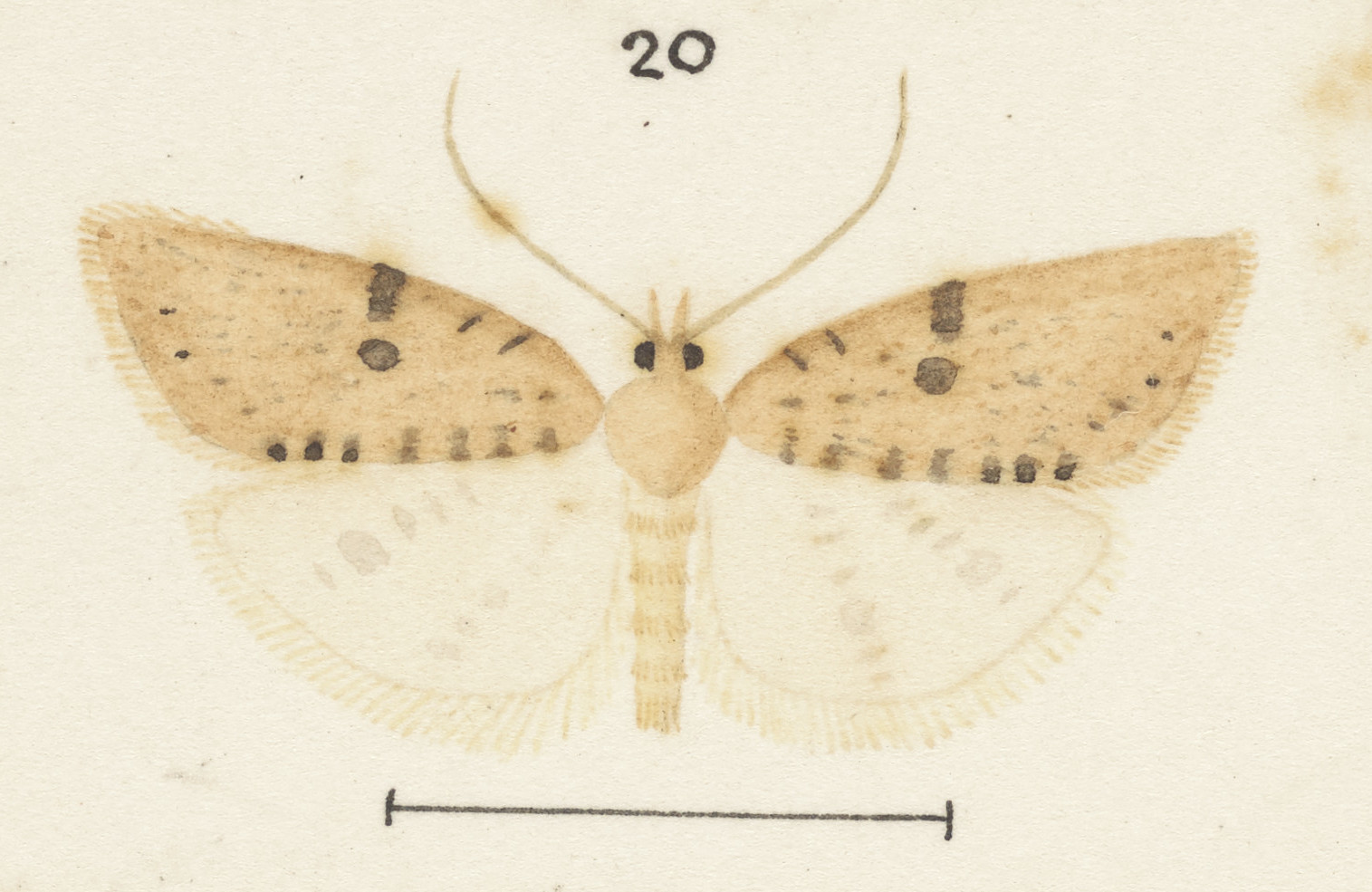

Scientific classification
- Kingdom: Animalia
- Phylum: Arthropoda
- Class: Insecta
- Order: Lepidoptera
- Family: Tortricidae
- Genus: Apoctena
- Species: A. persecta

Binomial name
- Apoctena persecta (Meyrick, 1914)

Synonyms
- Epichorista persecta Meyrick, 1914; Epichorista persecta var. semicocta Meyrick, 1914

= Apoctena persecta =

Species of moth

Apoctena persecta is a species of moth of the family Tortricidae. It is found in New Zealand, where it is found only on the South Island.

The wingspan is about 18–19 mm for both males and females. The forewings are ochreous whitish, sprinkled with light brownish. In males the forewings are posteriorly tinged with light brownish between the veins. The hindwings are whitish. There is a distinct variety, named semicocta, which has whitish-ochreous forewings, on the costal half suffused with brownish ochreous. The hindwings of this variety are also whitish.

The larvae feed on Coprosma species.
