= Rhomboceros =

Scientific classification
- Kingdom: Animalia
- Phylum: Arthropoda
- Class: Insecta
- Order: Lepidoptera
- Family: Tortricidae
- Tribe: Epitymbiini
- Genus: Rhomboceros; Meyrick, 1910

Genus of tortrix moths

Rhomboceros is a genus of moths belonging to the subfamily Tortricinae of the family Tortricidae.

== Species ==
- Rhomboceros acrographa (Diakonoff, 1953)
- Rhomboceros barbata Diakonoff, 1953
- Rhomboceros chalepa Diakonoff, 1984
- Rhomboceros ethica Diakonoff, 1953
- Rhomboceros homogama (Meyrick, 1910)
- Rhomboceros iridescens Diakonoff, 1953
- Rhomboceros nodicornis Meyrick, 1910
- Rhomboceros pulverulenta Diakonoff, 1953
- Rhomboceros rosacea Diakonoff, 1953
- Rhomboceros thelea (Diakonoff, 1953)

== See also ==
- List of Tortricidae genera
