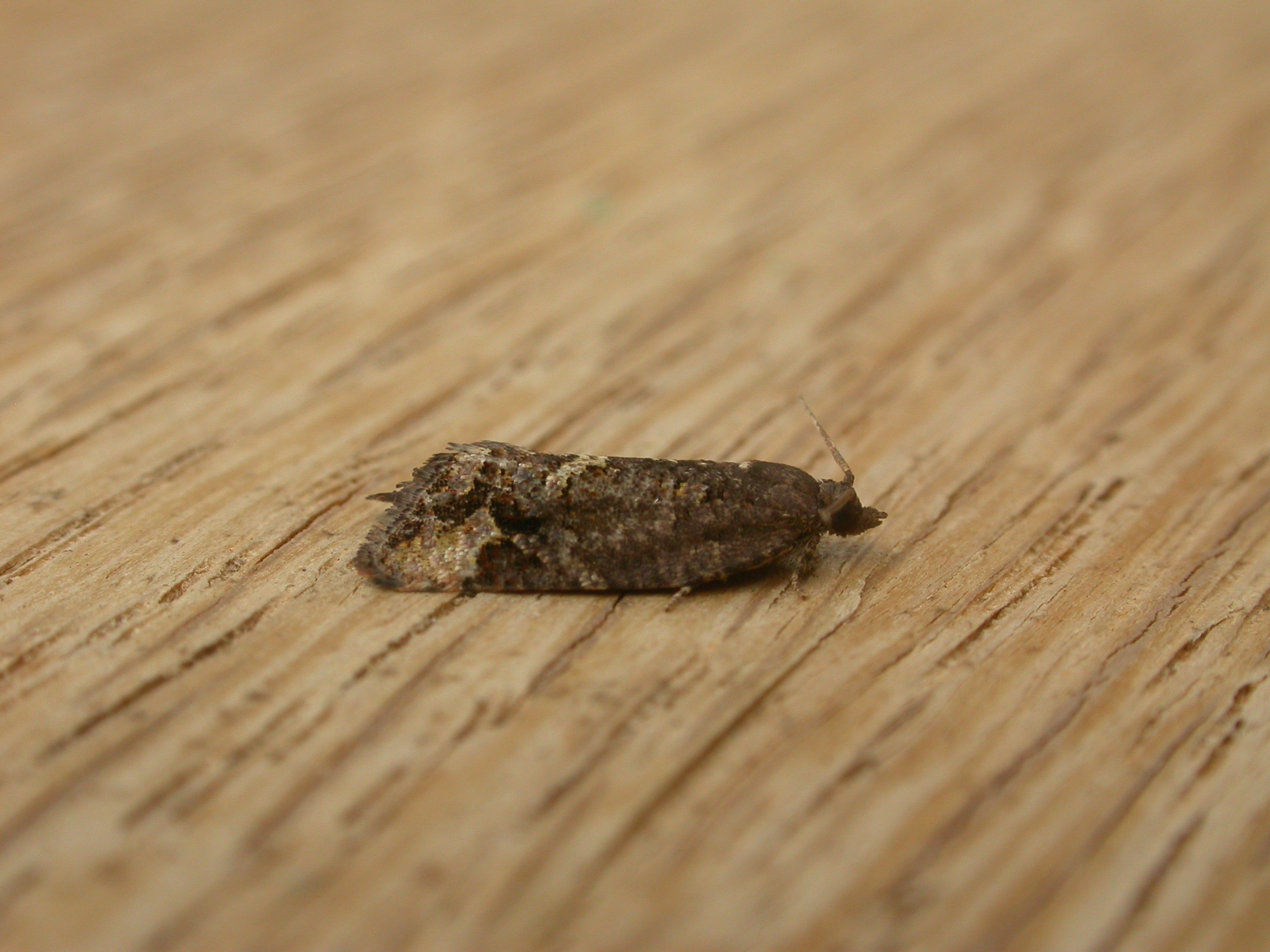
- Epitymbia alaudana.

Scientific classification
- Kingdom: Animalia
- Phylum: Arthropoda
- Class: Insecta
- Order: Lepidoptera
- Family: Tortricidae
- Tribe: Epitymbiini
- Genus: Epitymbia; Meyrick, 1881

= Epitymbia =

Genus of tortrix moths

Epitymbia is a genus of moths belonging to the subfamily Tortricinae of the family Tortricidae.

== Species ==
- Epitymbia alaudana Meyrick, 1881
- Epitymbia apatela Horak & Common, 1985
- Epitymbia cosmota (Meyrick, 1887)
- Epitymbia dialepta Horak & Common, 1985
- Epitymbia eudrosa (Turner, 1916)
- Epitymbia eutypa (Turner, 1925)
- Epitymbia isoscelana (Meyrick, 1881)
- Epitymbia passalotana (Meyrick, 1881)
- Epitymbia scotinopa (Lower, 1902)

== See also ==
- List of Tortricidae genera
