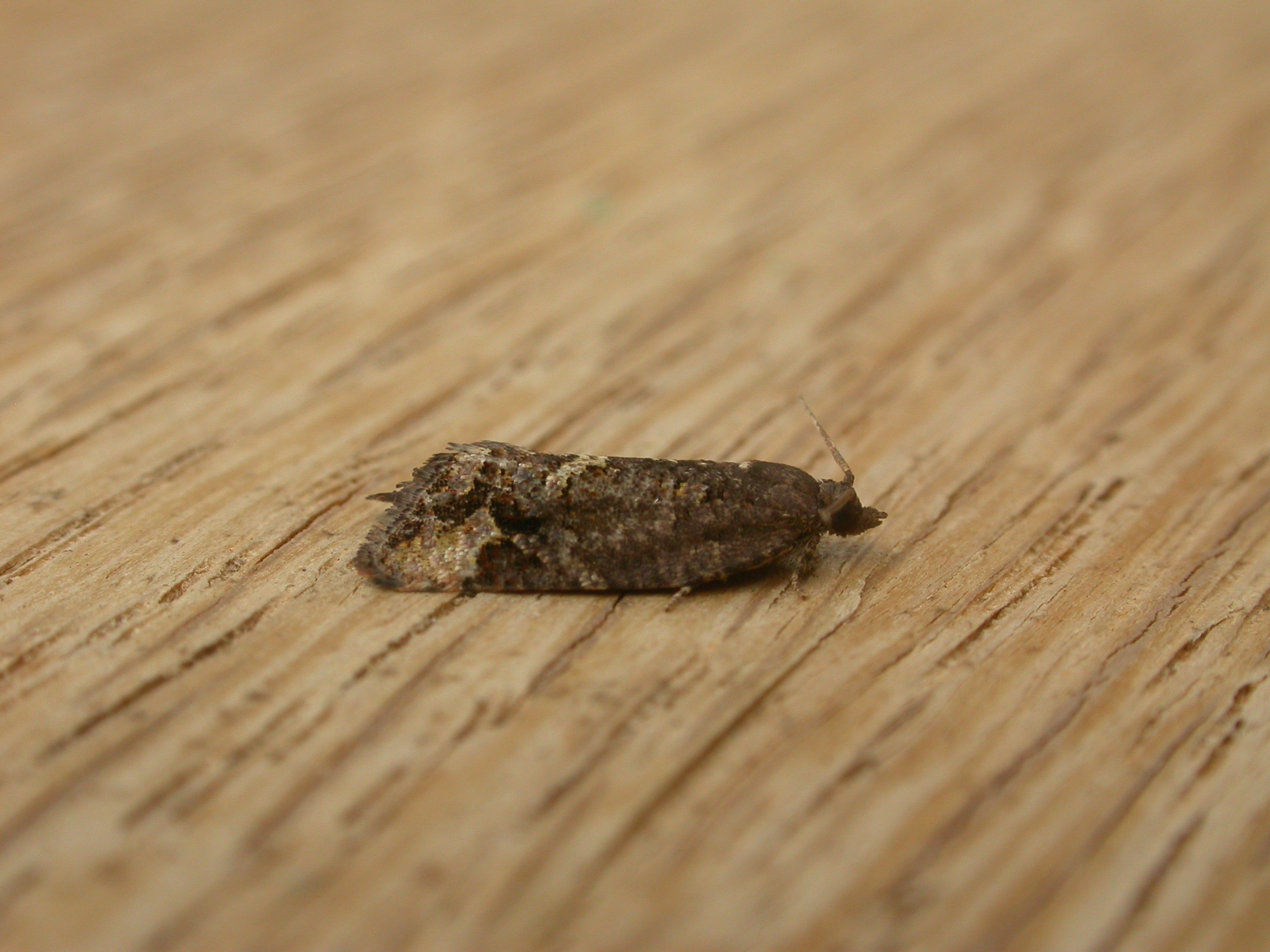

Scientific classification
- Kingdom: Animalia
- Phylum: Arthropoda
- Class: Insecta
- Order: Lepidoptera
- Family: Tortricidae
- Genus: Epitymbia
- Species: E. alaudana

Binomial name
- Epitymbia alaudana Meyrick, 1881

Synonyms
- Capua cydropis Turner, 1916; Capua periopa Meyrick, 1910

= Epitymbia alaudana =

Species of moth

Epitymbia alaudana is a species of moth of the family Tortricidae. It is found in Australia.

The wingspan is 18 mm. The forewings are whitish-brown with reddish-brown markings, partly edged and spotted with dark fuscous. The hindwings are deep ochreous, towards the termen irrorated (speckled) with fuscous.
