= Epitymbiini =

Scientific classification
- Domain: Eukaryota
- Kingdom: Animalia
- Phylum: Arthropoda
- Class: Insecta
- Order: Lepidoptera
- Family: Tortricidae
- Subfamily: Tortricinae
- Tribe: Epitymbiini; Common, 1958

Genera
- See text

Tribe of moths

The Epitymbiini are a tribe of tortrix moths.

== Genera ==
Aeolostoma
Anisogona
Aplastoceros
Apoctena
Asthenoptycha
Capnoptycha
Cleptacaca
Epitymbia
Goboea
Macrothyma
Meritastis
Mimeoclysia
Pandurista
Polydrachma
Rhomboceros
Sperchia
Trychnophylla
