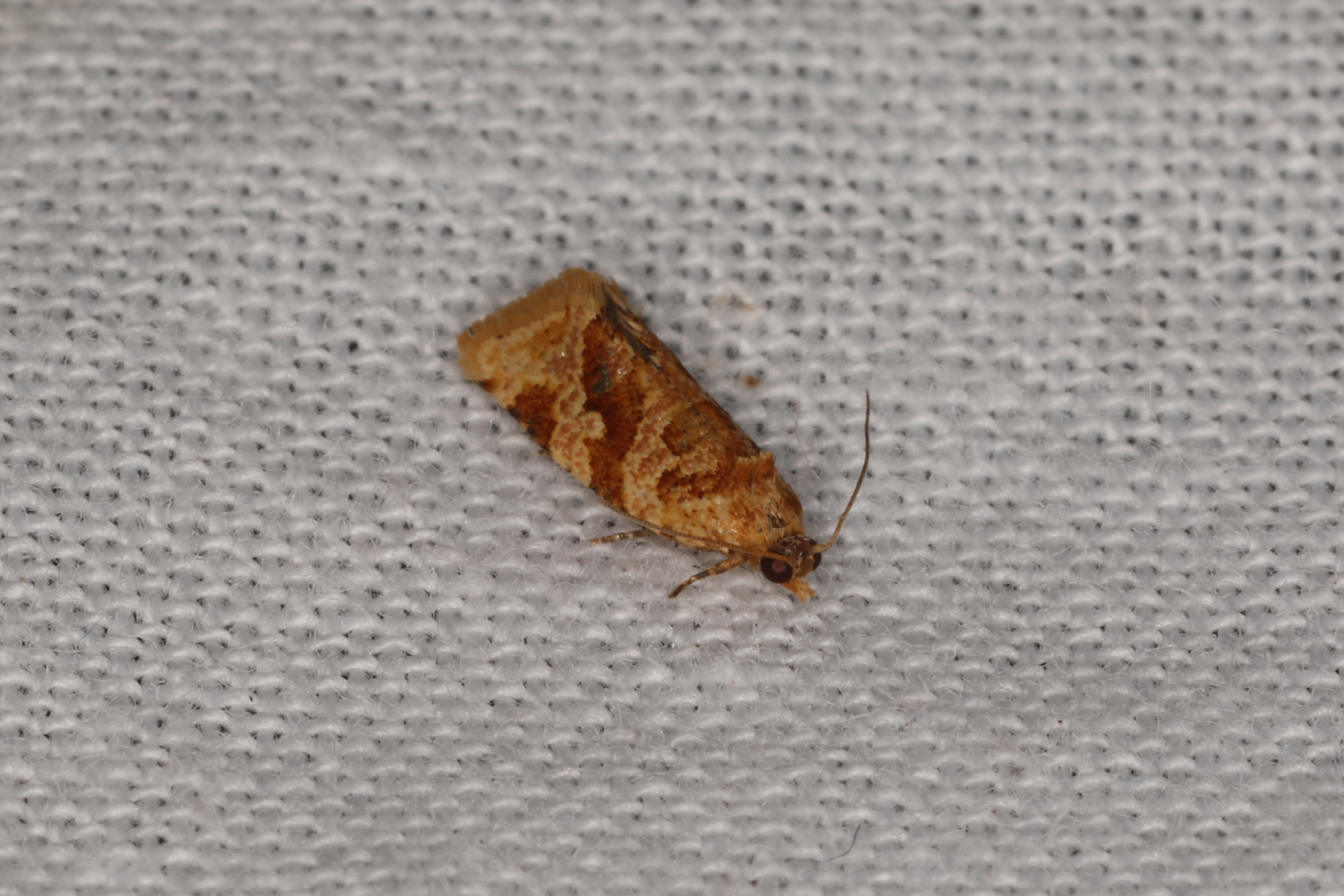
- Smithfield Regional Park, near JCU Cairns, Queensland

Scientific classification
- Kingdom: Animalia
- Phylum: Arthropoda
- Class: Insecta
- Order: Lepidoptera
- Family: Tortricidae
- Genus: Epitymbia
- Species: E. eudrosa

Binomial name
- Epitymbia eudrosa (Turner, 1916)

Synonyms
- Isochorista eudrosa Turner, 1916; Pyrgotis pyrrhocremna Meyrick, 1922

= Epitymbia eudrosa =

Species of moth

Epitymbia eudrosa is a species of moth in the family Tortricidae. It is found in Australia, where it has been recorded in Queensland.

The wingspan is 12–14 mm. The forewings are ochreous whitish, with a lustrous sheen. The markings are bright ferruginous. The hindwings are grey.
