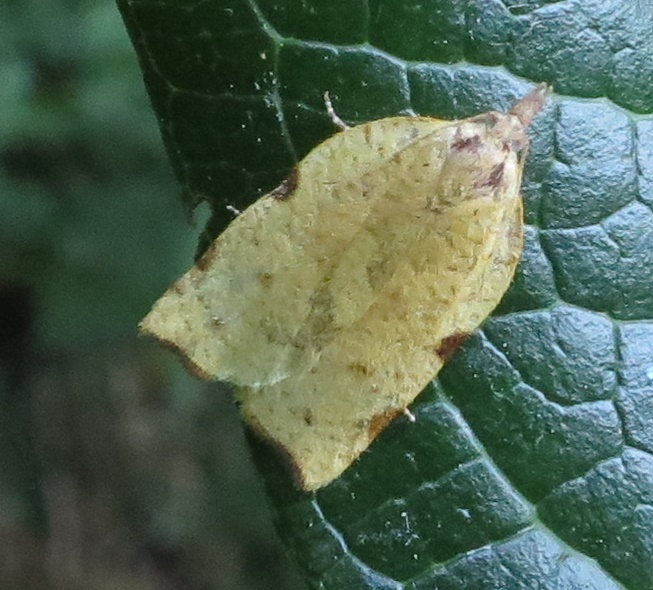

Scientific classification
- Kingdom: Animalia
- Phylum: Arthropoda
- Clade: Pancrustacea
- Class: Insecta
- Order: Lepidoptera
- Family: Tortricidae
- Genus: Apoctena
- Species: A. flavescens

Binomial name
- Apoctena flavescens (Butler, 1877)

Synonyms
- Teras flavescens Butler, 1877; Tortrix flaνescens (Butler, 1887); Planotortrix flavescens (Butler, 1877); Cacoecia acrocausta Meyrick, 1907; Tortrix acrocausta (Meyrick, 1907); Tortrix inusitata Philpott, 1919

= Apoctena flavescens =

Species of moth endemic to New Zealand

Apoctena flavescens is a species of moth of the family Tortricidae. This species was first described by Arthur Gardiner Butler in 1877. It is endemic to New Zealand, where it is found in the North Island, South and Stewart Islands. This species inhabits native forest and scrubland. The larvae are polyphagous and feed amongst their host plants, rolling or tying the plant leaves. The larvae may pose a threat to endangered New Zealand mistletoes. Adults extremely variable in appearance and can be confused with several other species. However many specimens have a dark patch of scales on the outer edge of the forewing which can assist with identification. Adults are on the wing most commonly from August to April. They are attracted to light and rest with wings held flat.

== Taxonomy ==
This species was first described by Arthur Gardiner Butler in 1877 using a specimen collected by James Hector probably in Dunedin and originally named Teras flavescens. In 1907 Edward Meyrick, thinking he was describing a new species, named this moth Cacoecia acrocausta. In 1919 Alfred Philpott, again thinking he was describing a new species, named this moth Tortrix inusitata. George Hudson discussed and illustrated this species under the names Tortrix flaνescens and Tortrix inusitata in his 1928 book The butterflies and moths of New Zealand. Hudson synonymised Cacoecia acrocausta with Tortrix flaνescens in that publication. In 1988 John S. Dugdale placed this species in the genus Planotortrix. In the same publication Dugdale also synonymised Tortrix inusitata with Plantortrix flavescens. In 1990 Dugdale placed this species in the genus Apoctena. The female holotype is held at the Natural History Museum, London.

However this species is currently regarded as being taxonomically unresolved as it likely belongs to another genus. It is therefore also known as Apoctena (s.l.) flavescens.

== Description ==
Illustration of male

Illustration of female

Illustration of melanic form

Butler originally described this species as follows:

Primaries straw-yellow, very indistinctly reticulated with deeper lines of the same colour; a spot at the extremity of the costal nervure, a second less distinct at the end of the second subcostal branch, and the apical half of the fringe, tawny ; secondaries white, tinted with stramineous towards costa; thorax ochraceous ; abdomen (probably white): primaries below whitish, with the basi-costal area and apex ochraceous, crossed by orange reticulations; apical fringe tawny; secondaries pale stramineous, reticulated with orange ; pectus silvery white, legs ochraceous. Expanse of wings 1 inch 4 lines.

Hudson when discussion this species under the name Tortrix flaνescens described it as follows:

The expansion of the wings is slightly over 3/4 inch. The fore-wings have the apex obtuse and the termen rounded and slightly oblique; rather dull yellowish-ochreous; the basal area to 3/4 is more or less clouded with brown and the costal edge is rusty red; there is often a number of blackish-grey spots near the termen and dorsum; below the apex the cilia are rusty red tipped with grey, the rest of the cilia being entirely yellow. The hind-wings are pale ochreous with faint grey spots. The female has rather more elongate wings than the male, is pale yellow with a series of rusty-brown spots on the costa and one spot on the termen below the apex.

This species is extremely variable in appearance and can be confused with several other species. Many specimens have a dark patch of scales on the outer edge of the forewing which can assist with identification.

== Distribution ==
This species is endemic to New Zealand and found in the North, South and Stewart Islands.

== Habitat and hosts ==
This species inhabits native forest and shrubland. The larvae are polyphagous and feed amongst their host plants, rolling or tying the plant leaves. Examples of endemic plant species that host the larvae include Aciphylla colensoi, Aristotelia serrata, Coriaria sarmentosa, Leucopogon fasciculatus, and Peraxilla colensoi.

The larvae of this species have been shown to feed on the leaves of New Zealand endemic and endangered mistletoe species. As a result of the polyphagous nature of A. flavescens larvae, they have the potential to possibly defoliate mistletoes should the larvae increase their numbers by feeding on other hosts and then move on to feed on mistletoes.

== Behaviour ==
Adults are on the wing most commonly from August to April. They are attracted to light. When at rest the adults wings are held flat.

== Parasitoids ==
Trigonospila brevifacies, a species of fly introduced to New Zealand as a biocontrol agent, has been shown to parasitise the larvae of A. flavescens.

== Gallery ==
Larva

Adult raised from larva

Melanic form
