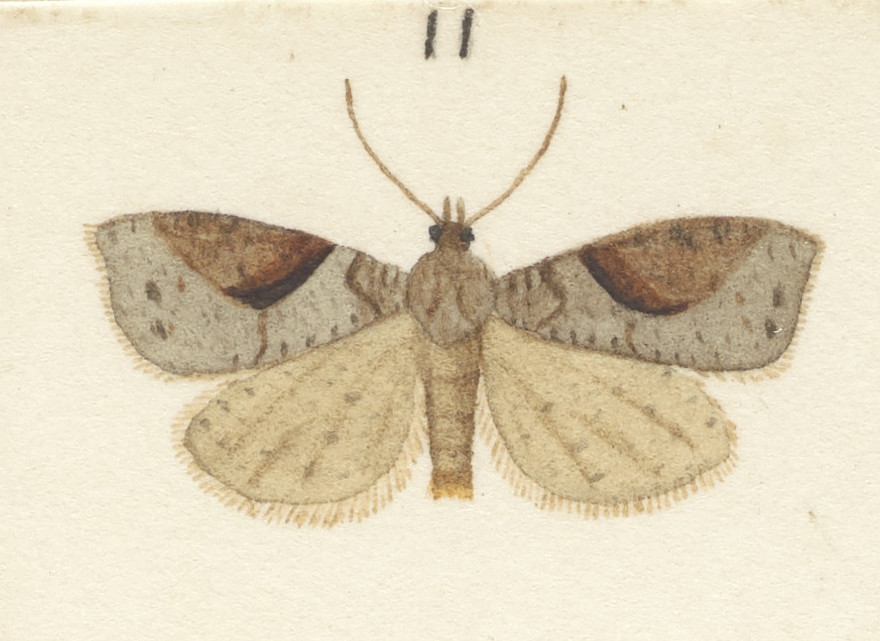

Scientific classification
- Kingdom: Animalia
- Phylum: Arthropoda
- Class: Insecta
- Order: Lepidoptera
- Family: Tortricidae
- Genus: Apoctena
- Species: A. orthropis

Binomial name
- Apoctena orthropis (Meyrick, 1901)

Synonyms
- Cacoecia orthropis Meyrick, 1901

= Apoctena orthropis =

Species of moth

Apoctena orthropis is a species of moth of the family Tortricidae. It is found in New Zealand, where it is found on both the North and South islands.
