= Pandurista =

Scientific classification
- Kingdom: Animalia
- Phylum: Arthropoda
- Class: Insecta
- Order: Lepidoptera
- Family: Tortricidae
- Tribe: Epitymbiini
- Genus: Pandurista; Meyrick, 1918

Genus of tortrix moths

Pandurista is a genus of moths belonging to the subfamily Tortricinae of the family Tortricidae.

== Species ==
- Pandurista encarsiotoma Diakonoff, 1953
- Pandurista euptycha Diakonoff, 1975
- Pandurista regressa Diakonoff, 1976
- Pandurista stictocrossa Meyrick, 1918

== See also ==
- List of Tortricidae genera
