= Capnoptycha =

Scientific classification
- Kingdom: Animalia
- Phylum: Arthropoda
- Class: Insecta
- Order: Lepidoptera
- Family: Tortricidae
- Tribe: Epitymbiini
- Genus: Capnoptycha; Meyrick, 1920

Genus of tortrix moths

Capnoptycha is a genus of moths belonging to the subfamily Tortricinae of the family Tortricidae.

== Species ==
- Capnoptycha cavifrons (Turner, 1926)
- Capnoptycha ipnitis (Meyrick, 1910)
- Capnoptycha tholera (Turner, 1925)
- Capnoptycha zostrophora (Turner, 1925)

== See also ==
- List of Tortricidae genera
