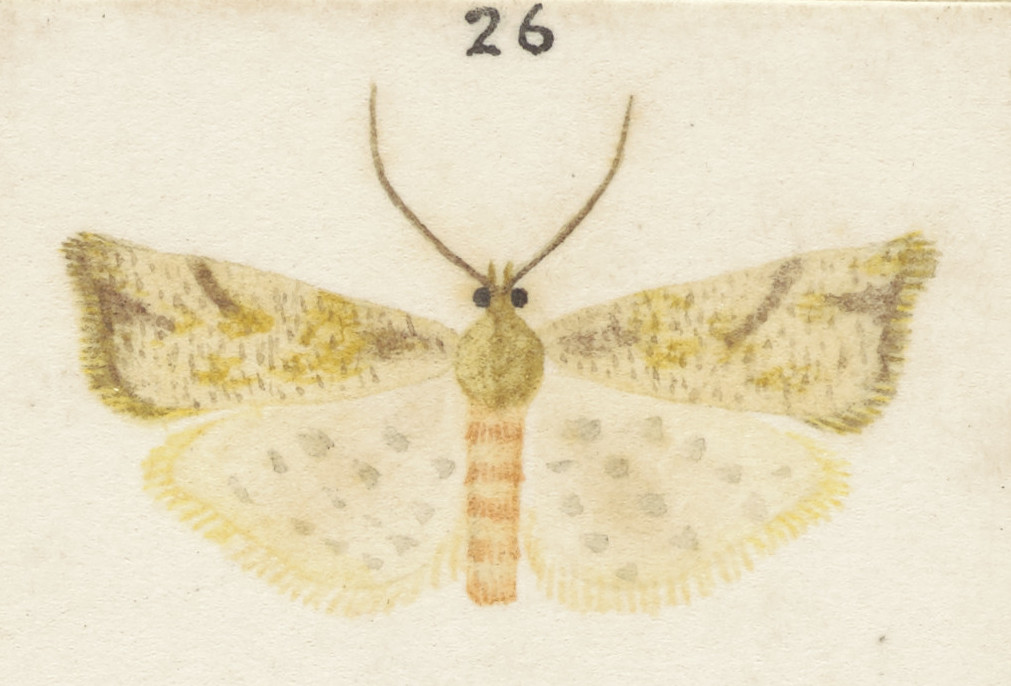
- Illustration of male

Scientific classification
- Domain: Eukaryota
- Kingdom: Animalia
- Phylum: Arthropoda
- Class: Insecta
- Order: Lepidoptera
- Family: Tortricidae
- Genus: Apoctena
- Species: A. fastigata

Binomial name
- Apoctena fastigata (Philpott, 1916)

Synonyms
- Tortrix fastigata Philpott, 1916; Tortrix ascomorpha Meyrick, 1934

= Apoctena fastigata =

Species of moth

Apoctena fastigata is a species of moth in the family Tortricidae. It is found in New Zealand, where it is only found on the South Island.

The wingspan is 21–24 mm. The forewings are pale yellow, irrorated (speckled) with purplish-brown. The markings in the males very obscure. The hindwings are pale whitish yellow sprinkled with purplish-brown.
