= Mimeoclysia mystrion =

Scientific classification
- Kingdom: Animalia
- Phylum: Arthropoda
- Class: Insecta
- Order: Lepidoptera
- Family: Tortricidae
- Genus: Mimeoclysia
- Species: M. mystrion

Binomial name
- Mimeoclysia mystrion Razowski, 2013

Species of moth

Mimeoclysia mystrion is a species of moth of the family Tortricidae first described by Józef Razowski in 2013. It is found on Seram Island in Indonesisa.

The wingspan is about 13.5 mm for males and 20 mm for females.

== Etymology ==
The specific name is derived from Greek mystrion (meaning a small spoon).
