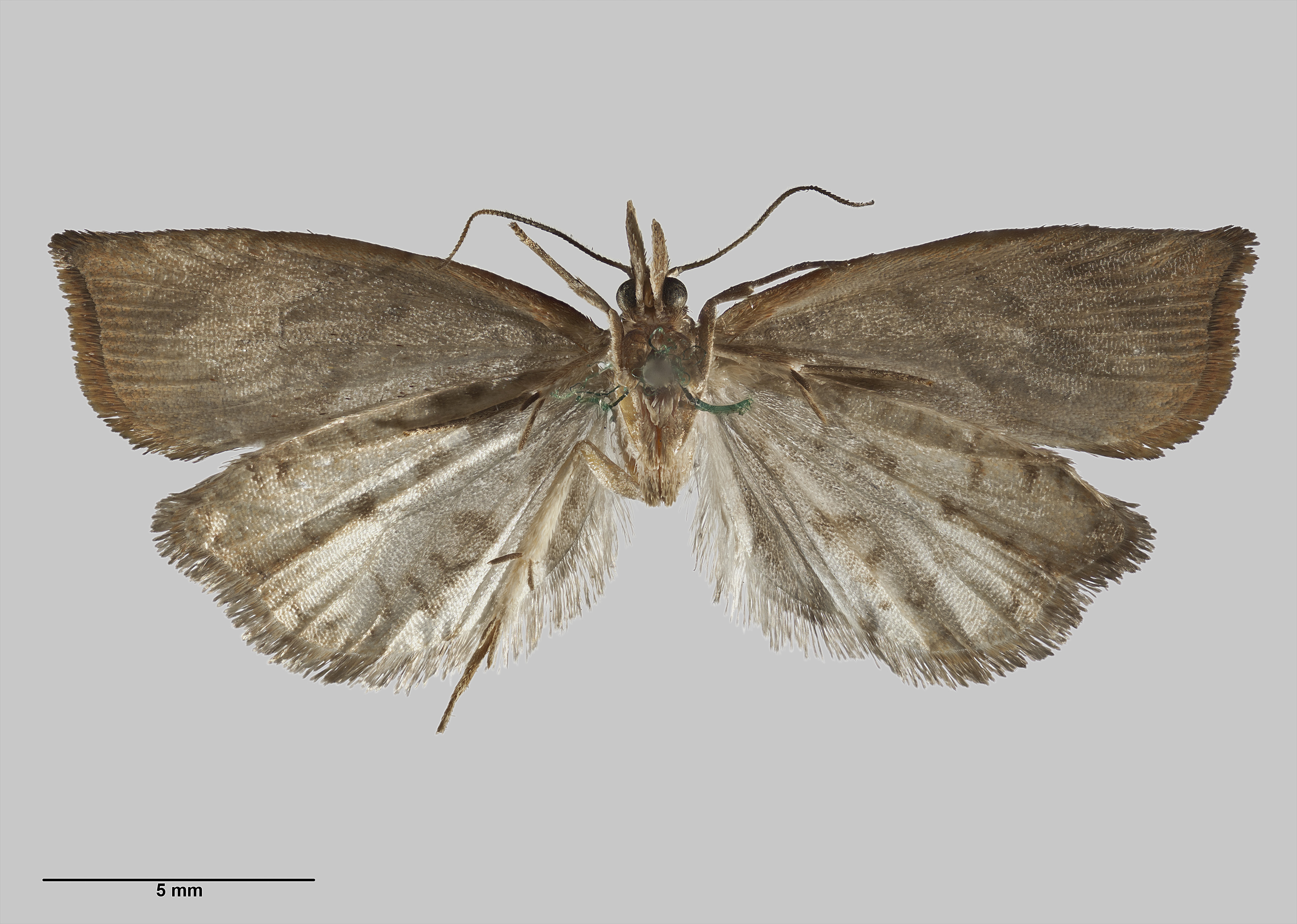
- Apoctena clarkei specimen

Scientific classification
- Kingdom: Animalia
- Phylum: Arthropoda
- Clade: Pancrustacea
- Class: Insecta
- Order: Lepidoptera
- Family: Tortricidae
- Tribe: Epitymbiini
- Genus: Apoctena; Dugdale, 1990

= Apoctena =

Genus of tortrix moths

Apoctena is a genus of moths belonging to family Tortricidae.

== Species ==
- Apoctena clarkei (Philpott, 1930)
- Apoctena conditana (Walker, 1863)
- Apoctena fastigata (Philpott, 1916)
- Apoctena flavescens (Butler, 1877)
- Apoctena orthocopa (Meyrick, 1924)
- Apoctena orthropis (Meyrick, 1901)
- Apoctena persecta (Meyrick, 1914)
- Apoctena pictoriana (Felder & Rogenhofer, 1875)
- Apoctena spatiosa (Philpott, 1923)
- Apoctena syntona (Meyrick, in Chilton, 1909)
- Apoctena taipana (Felder & Rogenhofer, 1875)
- Apoctena tigris (Philpott, 1914)

== See also ==
- List of Tortricidae genera
