= Sperchia =

Scientific classification
- Kingdom: Animalia
- Phylum: Arthropoda
- Class: Insecta
- Order: Lepidoptera
- Family: Tortricidae
- Tribe: Epitymbiini
- Genus: Sperchia; Walker, 1869

Genus of tortrix moths

Sperchia is a genus of moths belonging to the family Tortricidae.

== Species ==
- Sperchia intractana Walker, 1869

== See also ==
- List of Tortricidae genera
