= Polydrachma =

Scientific classification
- Kingdom: Animalia
- Phylum: Arthropoda
- Class: Insecta
- Order: Lepidoptera
- Family: Tortricidae
- Tribe: Epitymbiini
- Genus: Polydrachma; Meyrick, 1928

Genus of tortrix moths

Polydrachma is a genus of moths belonging to the subfamily Tortricinae of the family Tortricidae.

== Species ==
- Polydrachma aleatoria Meyrick, 1928
- Polydrachma virescens Diakonoff, 1975

== See also ==
- List of Tortricidae genera
