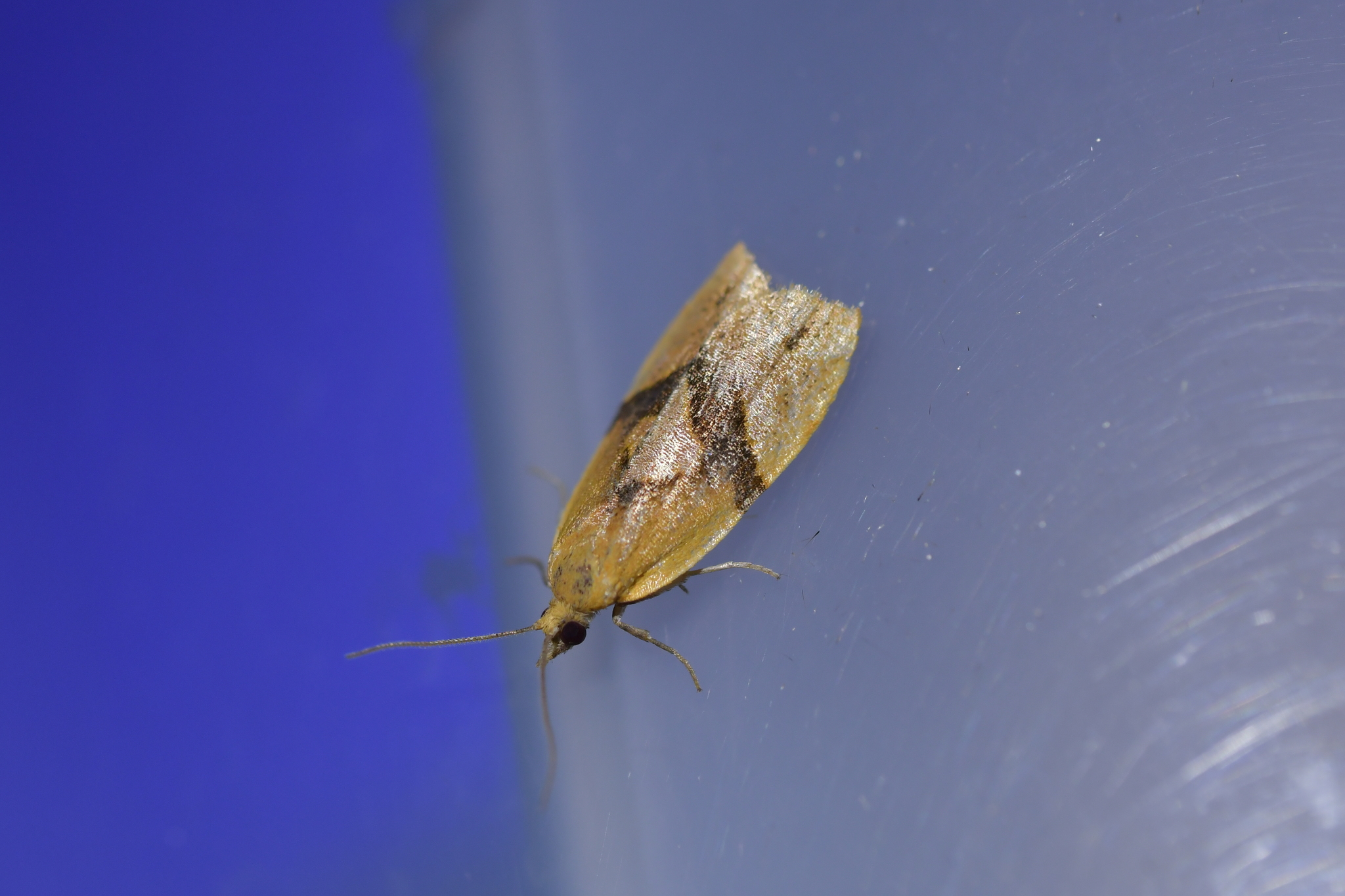

Scientific classification
- Domain: Eukaryota
- Kingdom: Animalia
- Phylum: Arthropoda
- Class: Insecta
- Order: Lepidoptera
- Family: Tortricidae
- Genus: Apoctena
- Species: A. pictoriana

Binomial name
- Apoctena pictoriana (Felder & Rogenhofer, 1875)

Synonyms
- Grapholitha pictoriana Felder & Rogenhofer, 1875

= Apoctena pictoriana =

Species of moth

Apoctena pictoriana is a species of moth of the family Tortricidae. It is found in New Zealand, where it is found on both the North and South islands.

The larvae feed on Nothofagus species.
