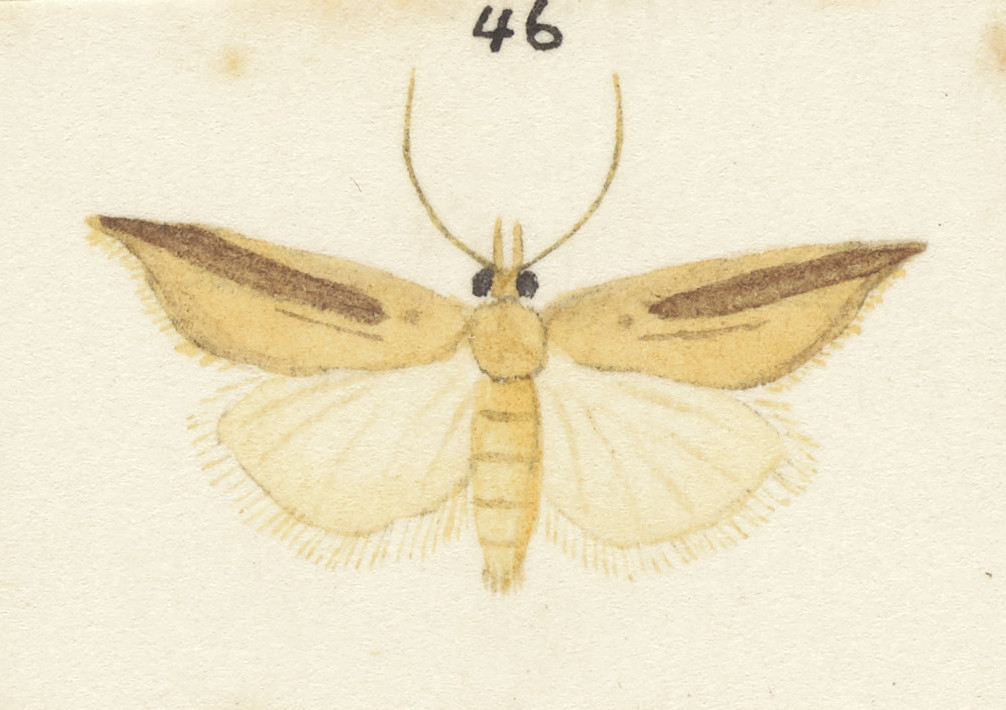

Scientific classification
- Kingdom: Animalia
- Phylum: Arthropoda
- Class: Insecta
- Order: Lepidoptera
- Family: Tortricidae
- Genus: Apoctena
- Species: A. syntona

Binomial name
- Apoctena syntona (Meyrick, in Chilton, 1909)

Synonyms
- Cacoecia syntona Meyrick, in Chilton, 1909; Planotortrix syntona laquaeorum Dugdale, 1971; Planotortrix syntona laqueorum Dugdale, 1988

= Apoctena syntona =

Species of moth

Apoctena syntona is a species of moth of the family Tortricidae. It is found in New Zealand.

The larvae are polyphagous.

== Subspecies ==
- Apoctena syntona syntona (Auckland Island)
- Apoctena syntona laqueorum (Dugdale, 1988) (the Snares)
