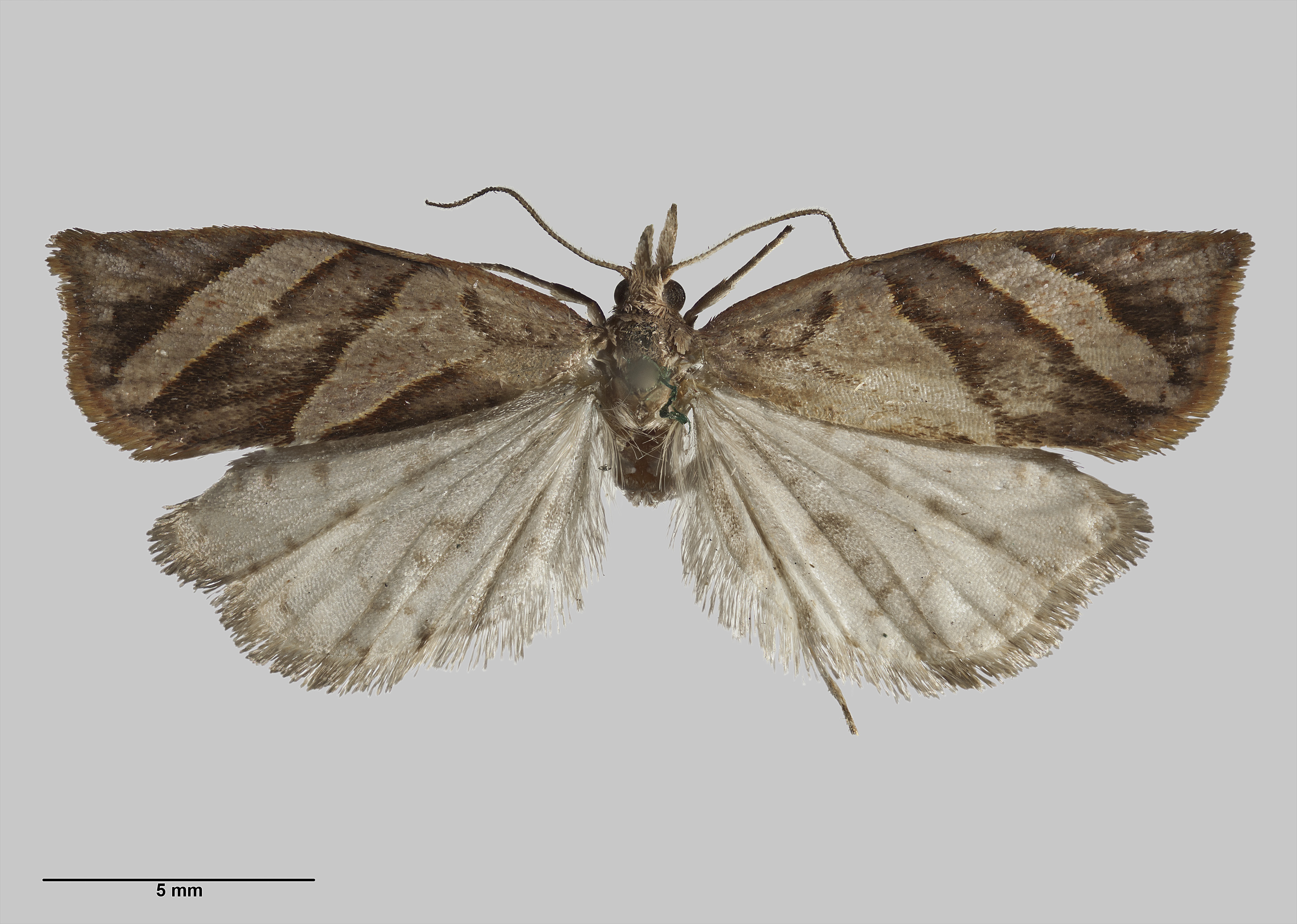
- Male holotype specimen

Scientific classification
- Kingdom: Animalia
- Phylum: Arthropoda
- Class: Insecta
- Order: Lepidoptera
- Family: Tortricidae
- Genus: Apoctena
- Species: A. clarkei

Binomial name
- Apoctena clarkei (Philpott, 1930)

Synonyms
- Tortrix clarkei Philpott, 1930

= Apoctena clarkei =

Species of moth

Apoctena clarkei, also known as the umbrella fern bell moth, is a species of moth of the family Tortricidae. It is found in New Zealand, where it is only found on the North Island.

== Description ==
The larvae of this species are coloured yellow to greenish and have a pale brown head. When mature they are approximately 25mm long.

== Behaviour ==
The larva of this species create silk webbing around the fronds of its host and hide within that structure. They will emerge from it to feed. The adult moth is on the wing in the New Zealand summer.

== Hosts ==
The larvae feed on Sticherus species including Sticherus cunninghamii.
