= Mimeoclysia =

Scientific classification
- Domain: Eukaryota
- Kingdom: Animalia
- Phylum: Arthropoda
- Class: Insecta
- Order: Lepidoptera
- Family: Tortricidae
- Tribe: Epitymbiini
- Genus: Mimeoclysia; Diakonoff, 1941

Genus of tortrix moths

Mimeoclysia is a genus of moths belonging to the subfamily Tortricinae of the family Tortricidae.

== Species ==
- Mimeoclysia dentata Diakonoff, 1953
- Mimeoclysia incompertana Kuznetzov, 2003
- Mimeoclysia mauroprosopa Diakonoff, 1984
- Mimeoclysia mystrion Razowski, 2013
- Mimeoclysia piridina Diakonoff, 1941
- Mimeoclysia strongylopa Diakonoff, 1983

== See also ==
- List of Tortricidae genera
