= Macrothyma =

Scientific classification
- Kingdom: Animalia
- Phylum: Arthropoda
- Class: Insecta
- Order: Lepidoptera
- Family: Tortricidae
- Tribe: Epitymbiini
- Genus: Macrothyma; Diakonoff, 1952

Genus of tortrix moths

Macrothyma is a genus of moths belonging to the subfamily Tortricinae of the family Tortricidae.

== Species ==
- Macrothyma sanguinolenta (Diakonoff, 1941)

== See also ==
- List of Tortricidae genera
