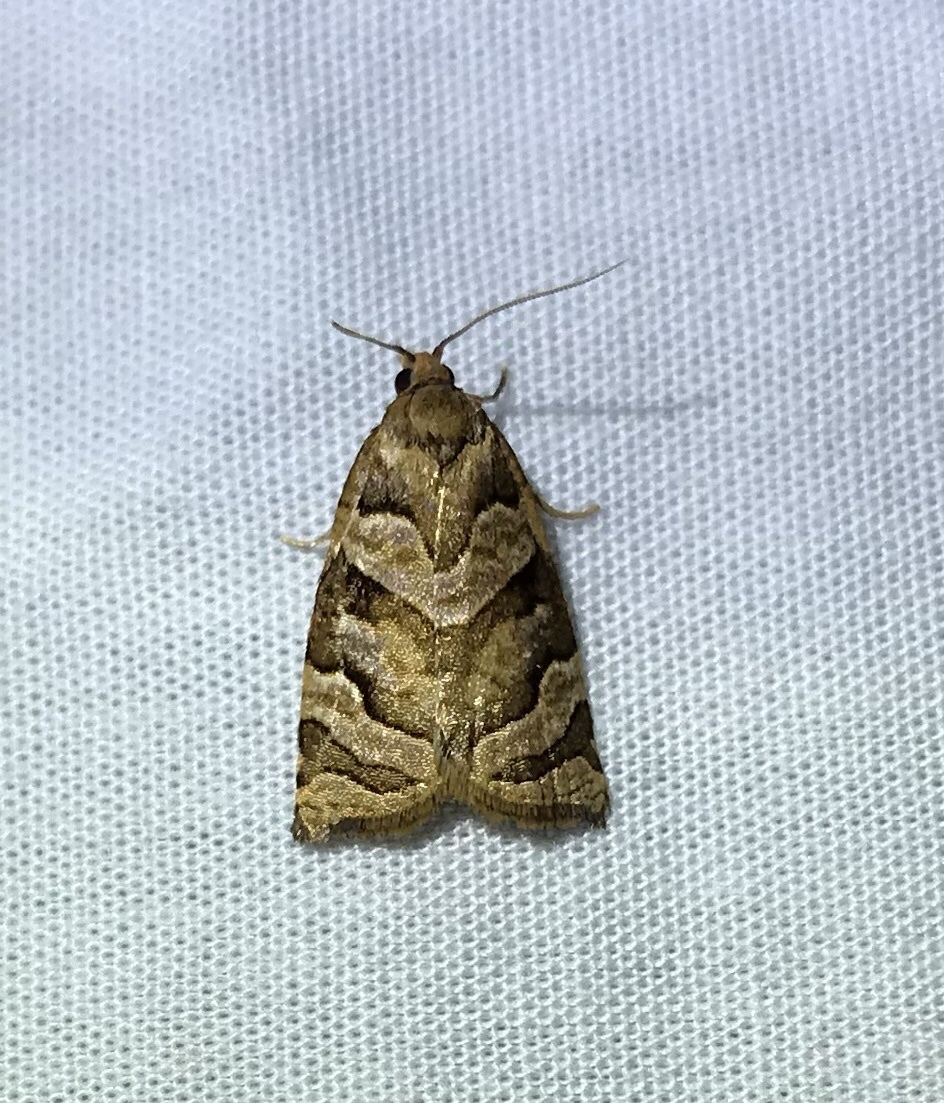

Scientific classification
- Kingdom: Animalia
- Phylum: Arthropoda
- Class: Insecta
- Order: Lepidoptera
- Family: Tortricidae
- Genus: Apoctena
- Species: A. tigris

Binomial name
- Apoctena tigris (Philpott, 1914)

Synonyms
- Tortrix tigris Philpott, 1914

= Apoctena tigris =

Species of moth

Apoctena tigris is a species of moth in the family Tortricidae. It is endemic to New Zealand. It is found on both the North and South islands.

The larvae of this species make silk tunnels on the fronds of their host species. The mature larva is pale green coloured with a pale brown head and is approximately 20 mm in length. The larvae keep their silk tunnels clean by flicking their waste.

The wingspan is about 22 mm. The forewings are whitish ochreous mixed with brown and with fuscous-brown markings. The hindwings are whitish grey. Adults were observed on Dicksonia fibrosa in January.

== Hosts ==
The larval host species is Dicksonia fibrosa.
