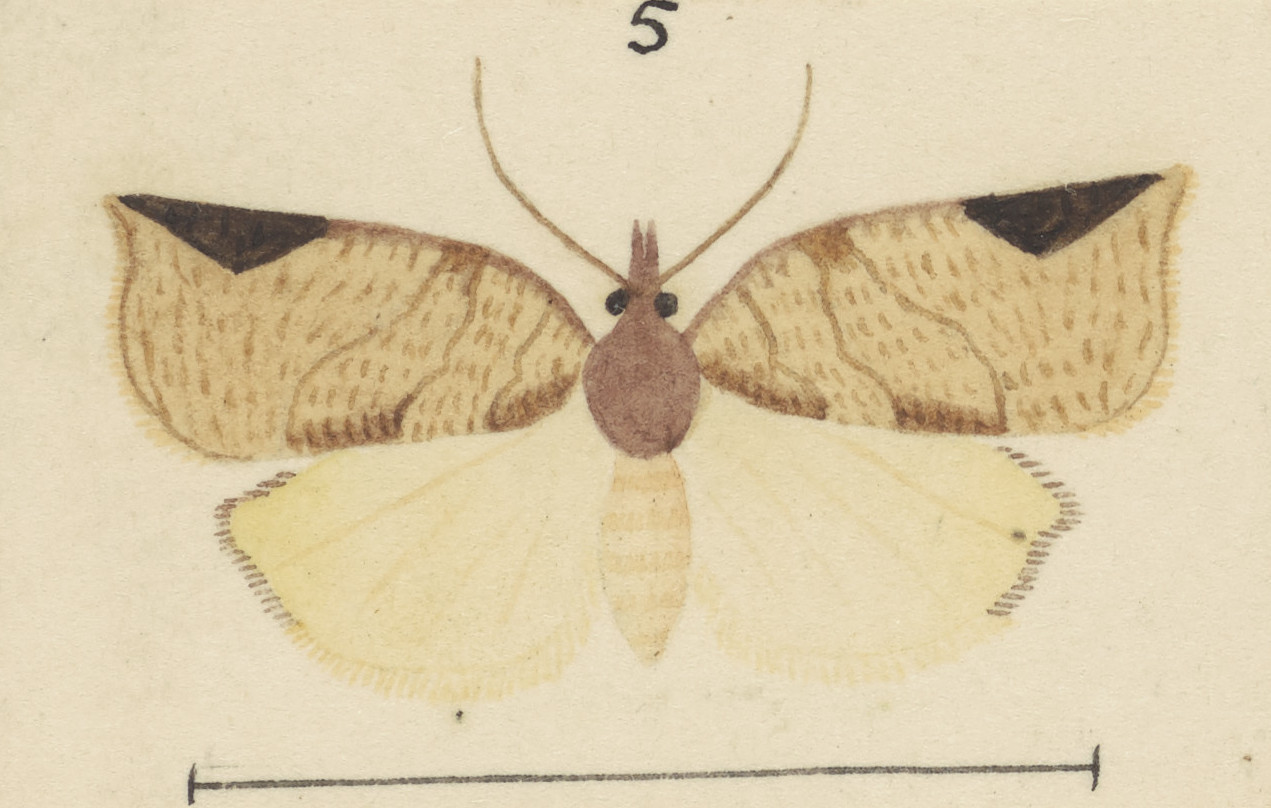

Scientific classification
- Domain: Eukaryota
- Kingdom: Animalia
- Phylum: Arthropoda
- Class: Insecta
- Order: Lepidoptera
- Family: Tortricidae
- Genus: Apoctena
- Species: A. spatiosa

Binomial name
- Apoctena spatiosa (Philpott, 1923)

Synonyms
- Tortrix spatiosa Philpott, 1923

= Apoctena spatiosa =

Species of moth

Apoctena spatiosa is a species of moth of the family Tortricidae. It is found in New Zealand, where it is located on both the North and South islands.

The larvae feed on Griselinia species.
