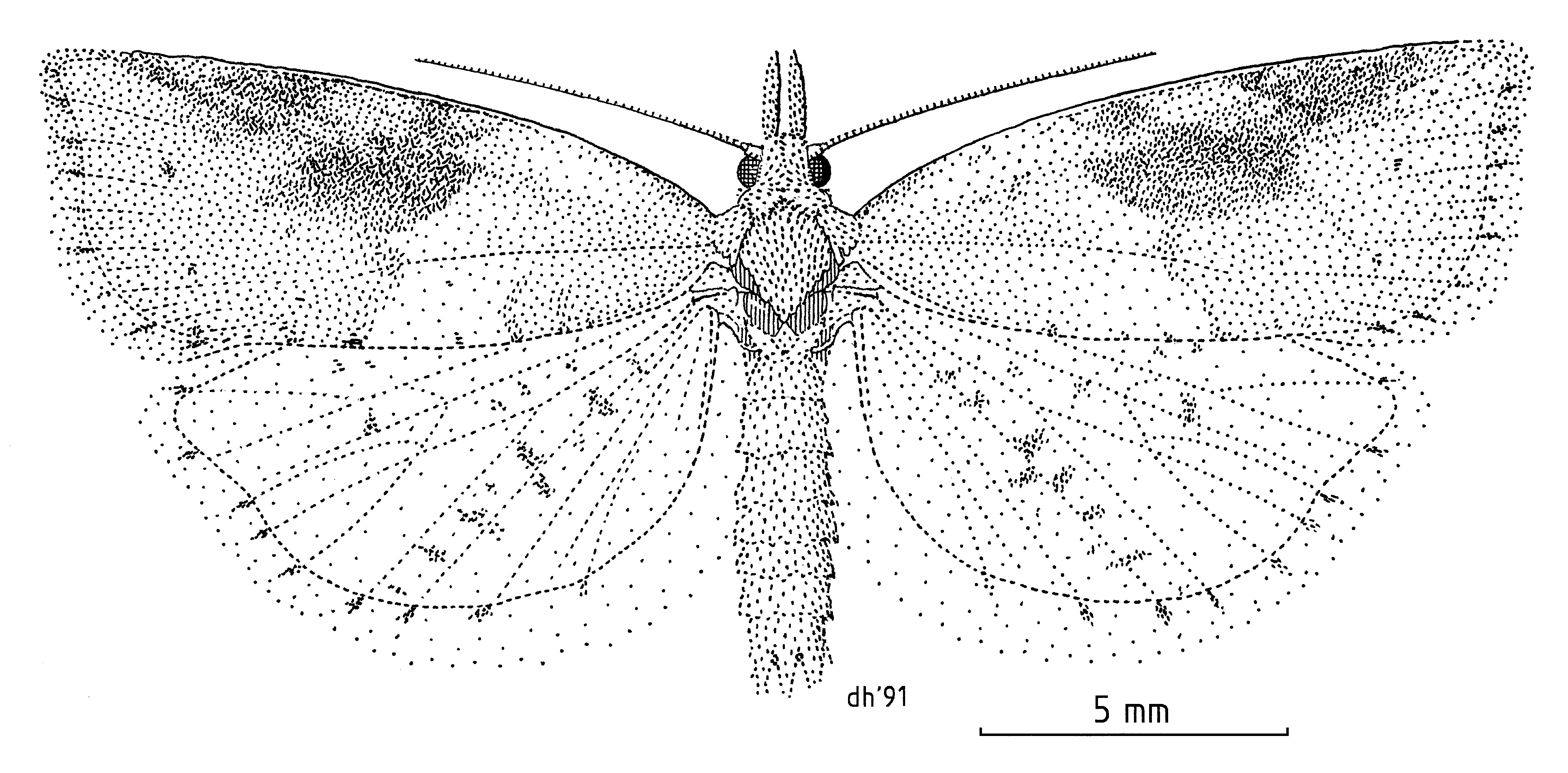

Scientific classification
- Kingdom: Animalia
- Phylum: Arthropoda
- Clade: Pancrustacea
- Class: Insecta
- Order: Lepidoptera
- Family: Tortricidae
- Genus: Apoctena
- Species: A. conditana

Binomial name
- Apoctena conditana (Walker, 1863)

Synonyms
- Teras conditana Walker, 1863; Cacoecia astrologana Meyrick, 1889; Cacoecia enoplana Meyrick, 1883; Planotortrix conditana Walker, 1863

= Apoctena conditana =

Species of moth

Apoctena conditana is a species of moth of the family Tortricidae. It is found in New Zealand, where it is found on both the North and South islands.

The larvae are polyphagous. Adults are attracted to light and have been collected via a mercury vapour light trap.
