= Cryptaspasma brachyptycha =

Scientific classification
- Kingdom: Animalia
- Phylum: Arthropoda
- Class: Insecta
- Order: Lepidoptera
- Family: Tortricidae
- Genus: Cryptaspasma
- Species: C. brachyptycha

Binomial name
- Cryptaspasma brachyptycha (Meyrick, 1911)

Synonyms
- Eucosma brachyptycha Meyrick, 1911; Cryptaspasma brachyptycha Clarke 1958

Species of moth

Cryptaspasma brachyptycha is a moth of the family Tortricidae first described by Edward Meyrick in 1911. It is found in Sri Lanka and Australia.

== Description ==
Adult male wingspan is 14–18 mm. Head and palpus brownish black. Antenna short and thickened. Thorax without a crest. Base of abdomen blackish purple which becomes grey posteriorly. Forewing elongate and triangular. Costa with a short triangular lobe. Apex rounded. Termen convex. Forewing cilia dark fuscous grey and hindwing with fuscous cilia. It has pale brown forewings with a large irregular dark brown patch in the middle. Hindwings brownish with velvety short hairs and without any markings.

Adult female wingspan is 19 mm. Head, palpus, and thorax deep purple. A small tuft found between bases of antennae. Abdomen dark bronze fuscous. Venter whitish ochreous. Forewings elongate triangular. Costa gently curved. Apex obtuse. Termen convex and oblique. Forewings deep purple with brownish irrorations (speckles). Markings are dark brown. A small whitish dot found on closing vein. Cilia similar to male. Hindwings bronze brown with a bright bronze gloss. Cilia glossy fuscous bronze.
