= Cryptaspasma sordida =

Scientific classification
- Domain: Eukaryota
- Kingdom: Animalia
- Phylum: Arthropoda
- Class: Insecta
- Order: Lepidoptera
- Family: Tortricidae
- Genus: Cryptaspasma
- Species: C. sordida

Binomial name
- Cryptaspasma sordida (Turner, 1945)

Synonyms
- Tortrix sordida Turner, 1945; Idiomorpha reticulata Turner, 1946

Species of moth

Cryptaspasma sordida is a species of moth of the family Tortricidae. It is found in New Caledonia and Australia, where it has been recorded from Queensland. The habitat consists of rainforests, as well as planted forests.
