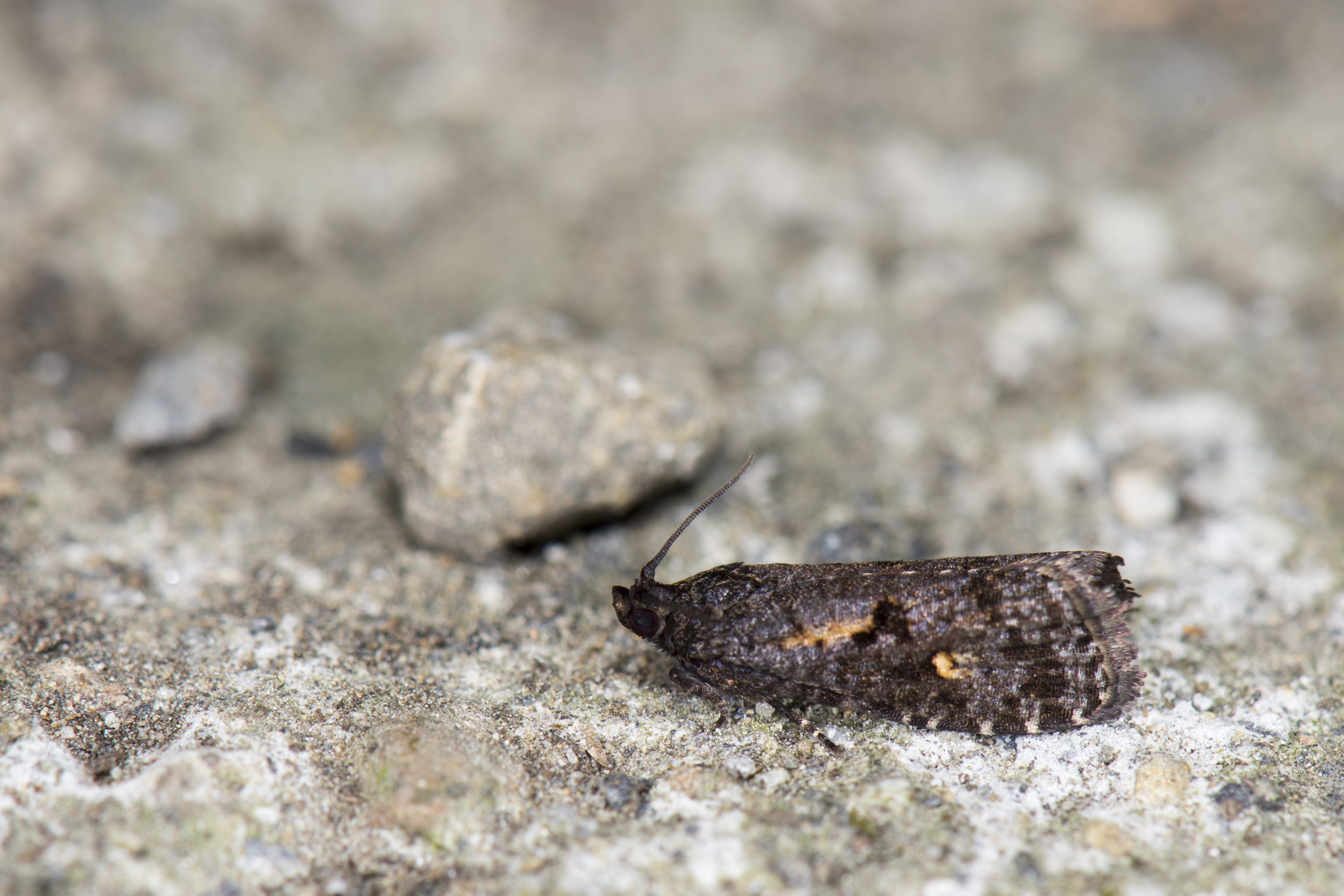

Scientific classification
- Domain: Eukaryota
- Kingdom: Animalia
- Phylum: Arthropoda
- Class: Insecta
- Order: Lepidoptera
- Family: Tortricidae
- Subfamily: Olethreutinae
- Tribe: Microcorsini; Kuznetzov, 1970

Genera
- See text

= Microcorsini =

Tribe of moths

The Microcorsini are a tribe of tortrix moths in the subfamily Olethreutinae, first described by V I Kuznetsov in 1970.

== Genera ==
Cryptaspasma
