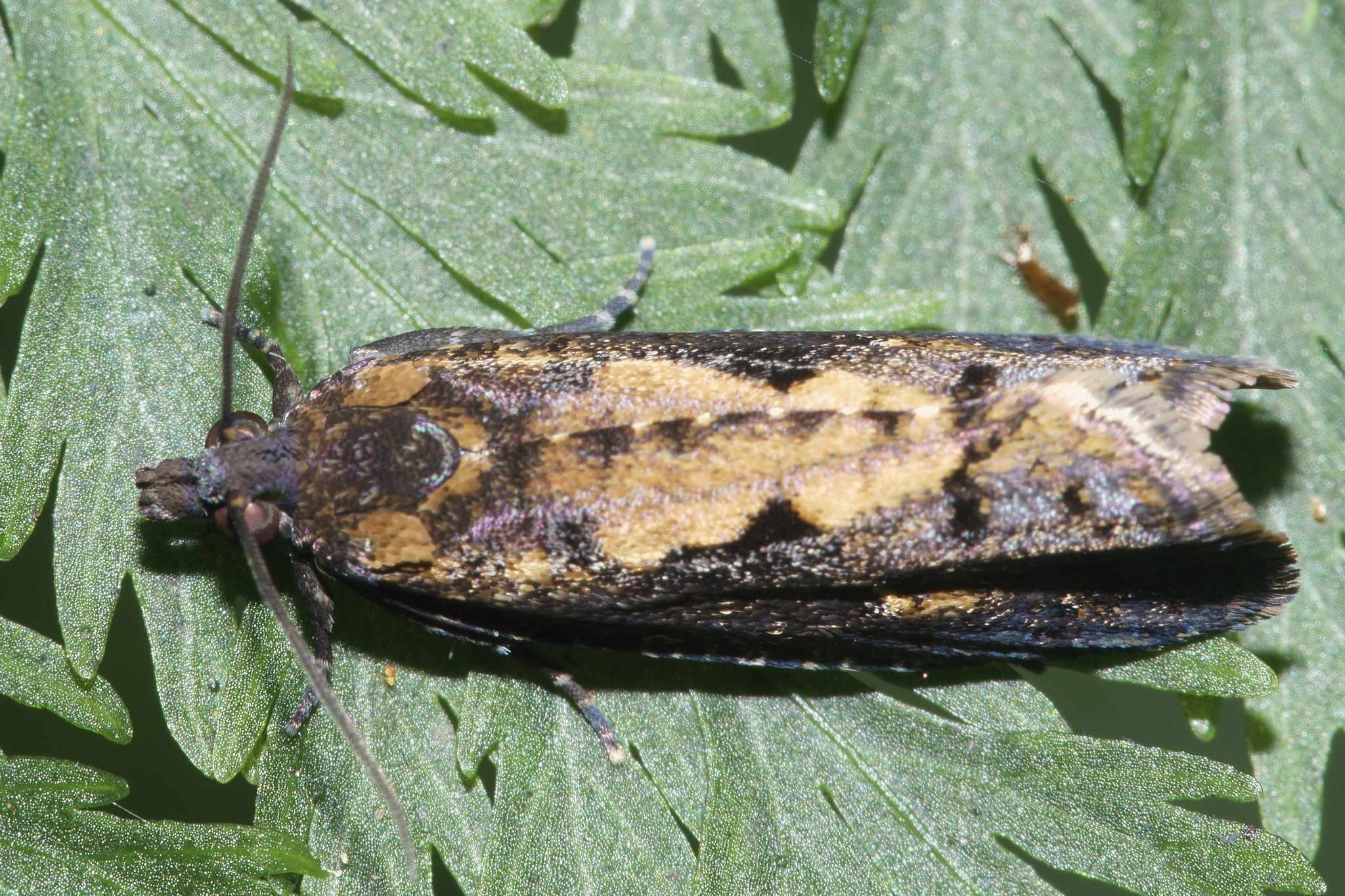

Scientific classification
- Kingdom: Animalia
- Phylum: Arthropoda
- Class: Insecta
- Order: Lepidoptera
- Family: Tortricidae
- Genus: Cryptaspasma
- Species: C. querula

Binomial name
- Cryptaspasma querula (Meyrick, 1912)

Synonyms
- Eucosma querula Meyrick, 1912

= Cryptaspasma querula =

Species of moth endemic to New Zealand

Cryptaspasma querula is a moth of the family Tortricidae. It is endemic to New Zealand and can be found throughout the country. This species inhabits podocarp and broadleaf forest. The larvae consume parts of the seeds and fruits of tawa, tarairi and miro trees and are predated upon by the invasive to New Zealand house mouse. Larvae pupate in leaf litter under their host trees. Adults are variable in appearance and also in size. They are on the wing throughout the year and are nocturnal but are attracted to light. They can be found having flown inside houses and have also been observed resting on fences or other human made structures during the day.

== Taxonomy ==
This species was first described by Edward Meyrick in 1912 and named Eucosma querula. George Hudson in his 1928 book The butterflies and moths of New Zealand discussed and illustrated this species under that name. Also in 1928 Alfred Philpott studied the male genitalia of this species. Alexey Diakonoff placed this species within the genus Cryptaspasma in 1959. The male lectotype, collected in Wellington by George Hudson, is held at the Natural History Museum, London.

== Description ==
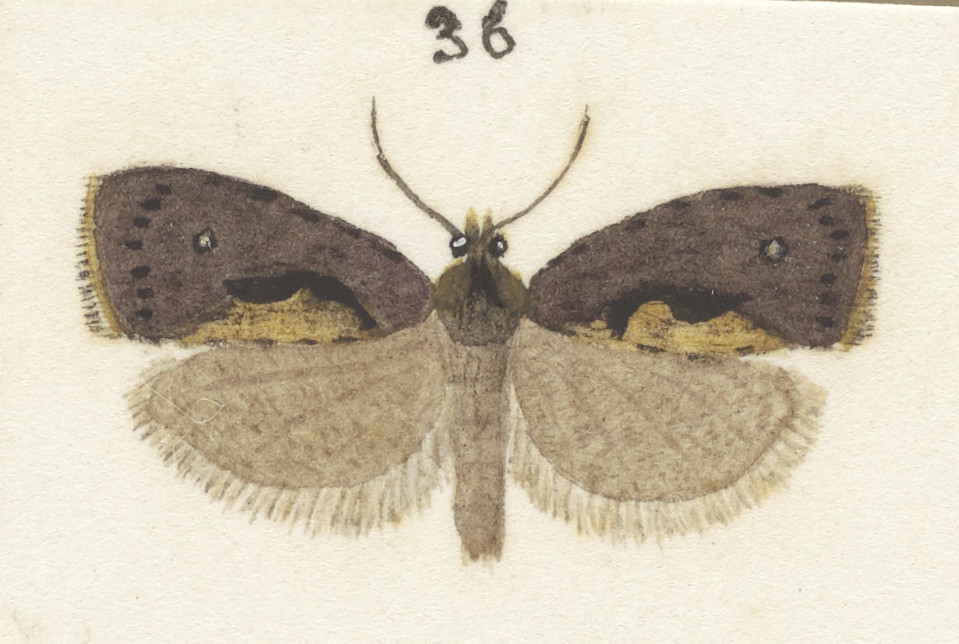
Illustration of male by G. Hudson.

Meyrick described the adults of this species as follows:

♂♀. 21-28 mm. Head, palpi, and thorax dark fuscous. Abdomen fuscous, not hairy. Forewings elongate-triangular, costa gently arched, in♂ with very short and narrow basal fold, apex obtuse, termen rounded, rather oblique; purplish-bronzy-fuscous suffusedly mixed and strigulated with dark fuscous; costa obscurely pale-strigulated on posterior 2/3; a whitish or ochreous-whitish dot in disc at 2/3; two or three variable curved transverse series of small dark-fuscous spots or dots between this and termen : cilia fuscous, with darker line near base. Hindwings fuscous, posteriorly sometimes faintly darker-strigulated; in ♂ without special characters; cilia pale fuscous.

Adults of C. querula is variable in both the appearance of the yellow markings on their wings as well as in their size. The female tends to be more plainly coloured than the male.

== Distribution ==
This species is endemic to New Zealand and is found throughout the country.

== Habitat and hosts ==
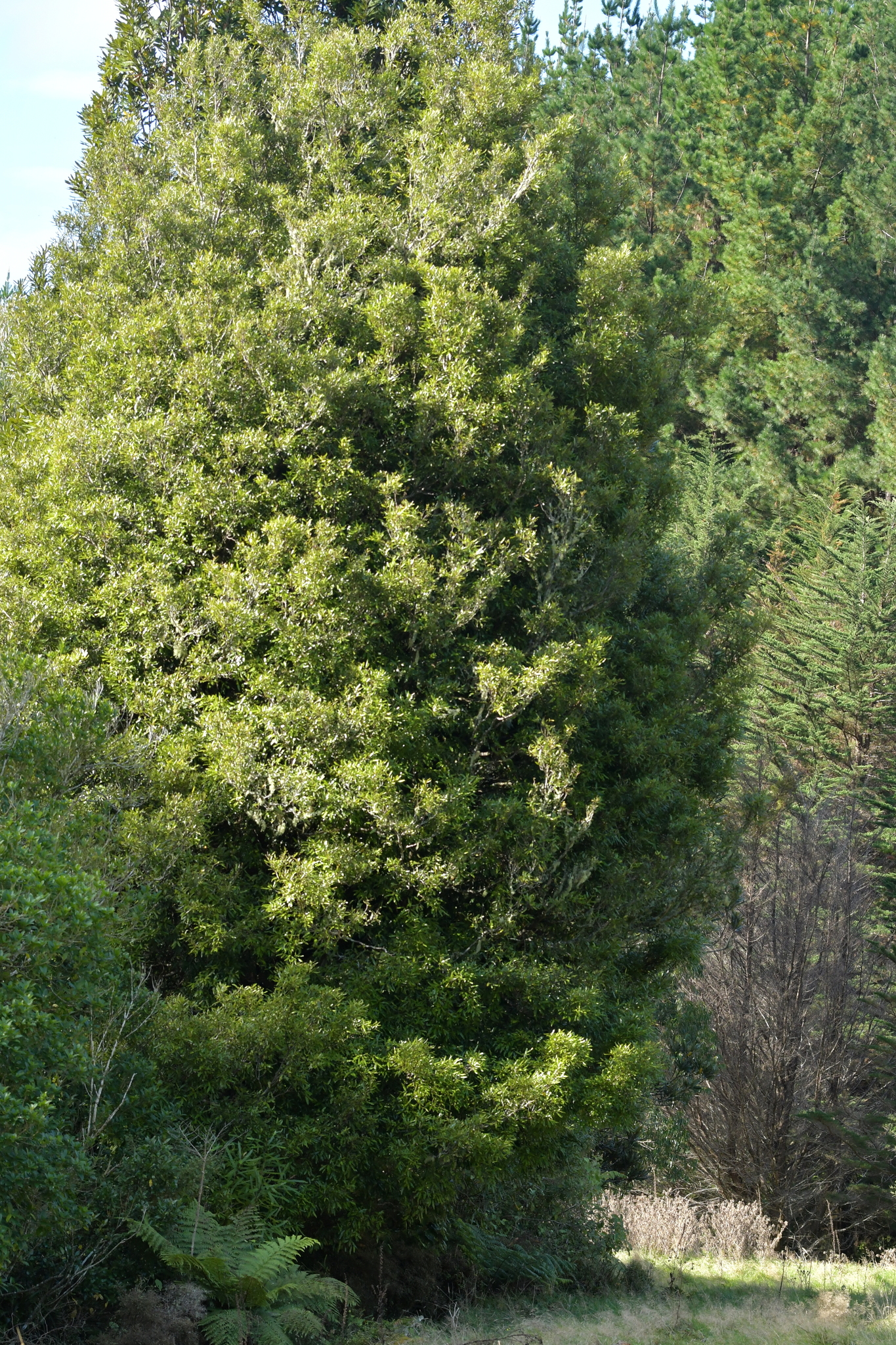
Larval host Beilschmiedia tawa.

This species inhabits native podocarp and broadleaf forest. The larvae feed on the fleshy cotyledons of Beilschmiedia tawa seeds as well as on the endosperm of the fruits of B. tawa, tarairi and miro trees. Larvae of this species has also been raised in captivity on common oak. The larvae of this species are a common food source for Mus musculus.

== Behaviour ==
The larvae of this species pupates in the leaf litter under their host species. Adults of this species is on the wing most months of the year. Although they can be disturbed during the day, they are nocturnal and are attracted to light. They can be found inside houses due to this attraction and have also been observed resting on fences or other human made structures.
