= Cryptaspasma phycitinana =

Scientific classification
- Domain: Eukaryota
- Kingdom: Animalia
- Phylum: Arthropoda
- Class: Insecta
- Order: Lepidoptera
- Family: Tortricidae
- Genus: Cryptaspasma
- Species: C. phycitinana

Binomial name
- Cryptaspasma phycitinana Aarvik, 2005

Species of moth

Cryptaspasma phycitinana is a species of moth of the family Tortricidae. It is found in Kenya and Tanzania.

The larvae feed on Ocimum suave.
