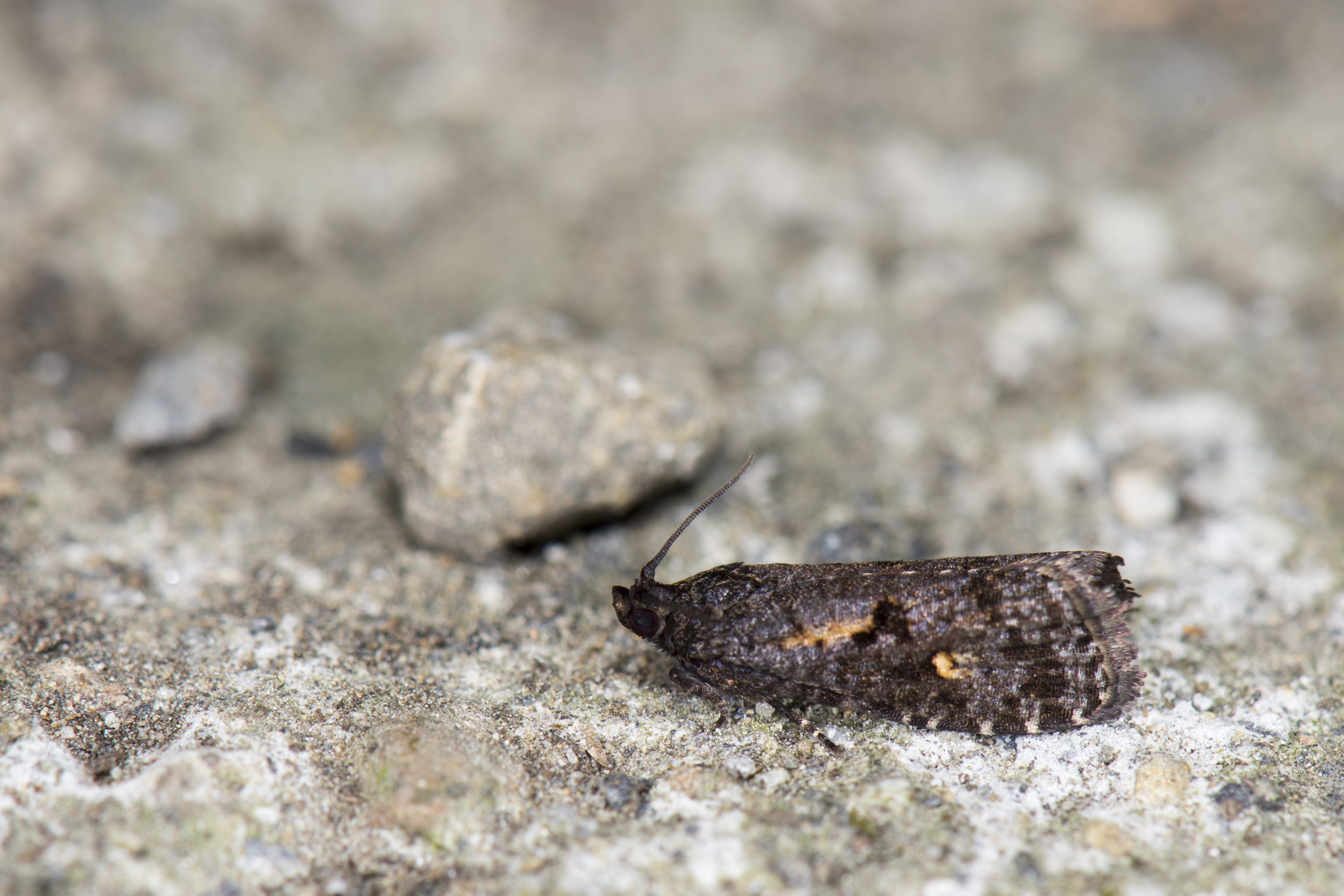

Scientific classification
- Domain: Eukaryota
- Kingdom: Animalia
- Phylum: Arthropoda
- Class: Insecta
- Order: Lepidoptera
- Family: Tortricidae
- Tribe: Microcorsini
- Genus: Cryptaspasma; Walsingham, 1900

= Cryptaspasma =

Genus of tortrix moths

Cryptaspasma is a genus of moths belonging to the subfamily Olethreutinae of the family Tortricidae.

== Species ==
- Cryptaspasma achlyoptera Clarke, 1976
- Cryptaspasma acrolophoides (Meyrick, 1931)
- Cryptaspasma anaphorana (Walsingham, 1914)
- Cryptaspasma angulicostana (Walsingham, 1900)
- Cryptaspasma anisopis Diakonoff, 1959
- Cryptaspasma athymopis Diakonoff, 1959
- Cryptaspasma bipenicilla Brown & Brown, 2004
- Cryptaspasma brachyptycha (Meyrick, 1911)
- Cryptaspasma caryothicta (Meyrick, 1920)
- Cryptaspasma debeauforti Diakonoff, 1959
- Cryptaspasma geina Diakonoff, 1959
- Cryptaspasma glebaecolor Diakonoff, 1959
- Cryptaspasma haplophyes Diakonoff, 1959
- Cryptaspasma helota (Meyrick, 1905)
- Cryptaspasma hesyca Diakonoff, 1959
- Cryptaspasma lasiura (Meyrick, 1912)
- Cryptaspasma lugubris (Felder & Rogenhofer, 1875)
- Cryptaspasma marginifasciatus (Walsingham, 1900)
- Cryptaspasma microloga Diakonoff, 1959
- Cryptaspasma mirabilis (Kuznetzov, 1964)
- Cryptaspasma ochrotricha Diakonoff, 1959
- Cryptaspasma orphnina Diakonoff, 1959
- Cryptaspasma pelagia Diakonoff, 1959
- Cryptaspasma peratra Diakonoff, 1959
- Cryptaspasma phycitinana Aarvik, 2005
- Cryptaspasma polysticta Clarke, 1976
- Cryptaspasma pullatana Bradley, 1982
- Cryptaspasma querula (Meyrick, 1912)
- Cryptaspasma sordida (Turner, 1945)
- Cryptaspasma subtilis Diakonoff, 1959
- Cryptaspasma syostoma Diakonoff, 1959
- Cryptaspasma trigonana (Walsingham, 1900)
- Cryptaspasma triopis Diakonoff, 1959
- Cryptaspasma zigzag Diakonoff, 1983
- Cryptaspasma zophocosma (Meyrick, 1931)

== See also ==
- List of Tortricidae genera
