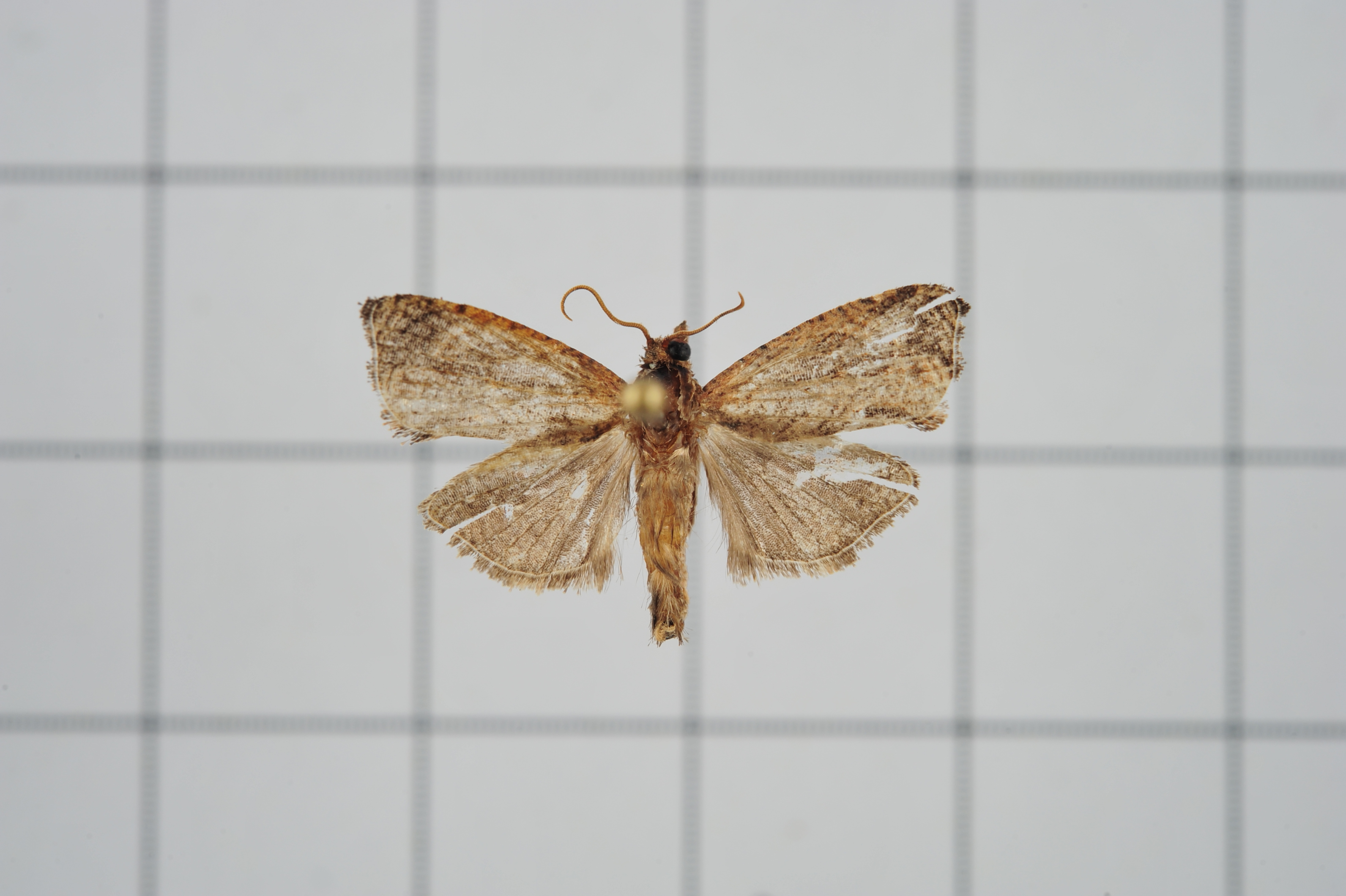

Scientific classification
- Kingdom: Animalia
- Phylum: Arthropoda
- Class: Insecta
- Order: Lepidoptera
- Family: Tortricidae
- Genus: Cryptaspasma
- Species: C. helota

Binomial name
- Cryptaspasma helota (Meyrick, 1905)

Synonyms
- Notocelia helota Meyrick, 1905; Hysterosia zophocosma Meyrick, 1931; Cryptaspasma lugubris Diakonoff (nec Felder), 1949

= Cryptaspasma helota =

Species of moth

Cryptaspasma helota is a moth of the family Tortricidae. It is found in Sri Lanka, India, China, Taiwan, Japan and northern Vietnam.
