= Cryptaspasma anaphorana =

Scientific classification
- Domain: Eukaryota
- Kingdom: Animalia
- Phylum: Arthropoda
- Class: Insecta
- Order: Lepidoptera
- Family: Tortricidae
- Genus: Cryptaspasma
- Species: C. anaphorana

Binomial name
- Cryptaspasma anaphorana (Walsingham, 1914)

Synonyms
- Olethreutes anaphorana Walsingham, 1914

Species of moth

Cryptaspasma anaphorana is a moth of the family Tortricidae first described by Lord Walsingham in 1914. It is found in Panama.
