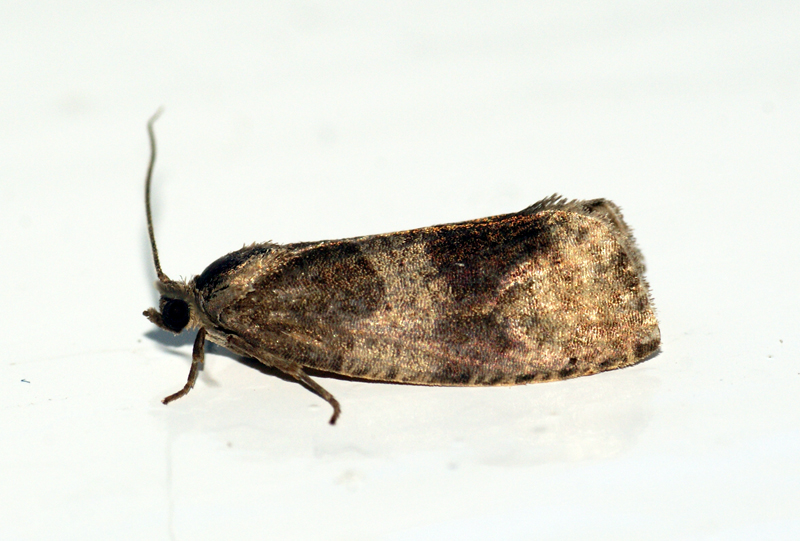

Scientific classification
- Kingdom: Animalia
- Phylum: Arthropoda
- Class: Insecta
- Order: Lepidoptera
- Family: Tortricidae
- Genus: Pseudosciaphila
- Species: P. branderiana

Binomial name
- Pseudosciaphila branderiana (Linnaeus, 1758)

= Pseudosciaphila branderiana =

Species of moth

Pseudosciaphila branderiana is a moth belonging to the family Tortricidae. The species was first described by Carl Linnaeus in his landmark 1758 10th edition of Systema Naturae.

It is native to Eurasia.
