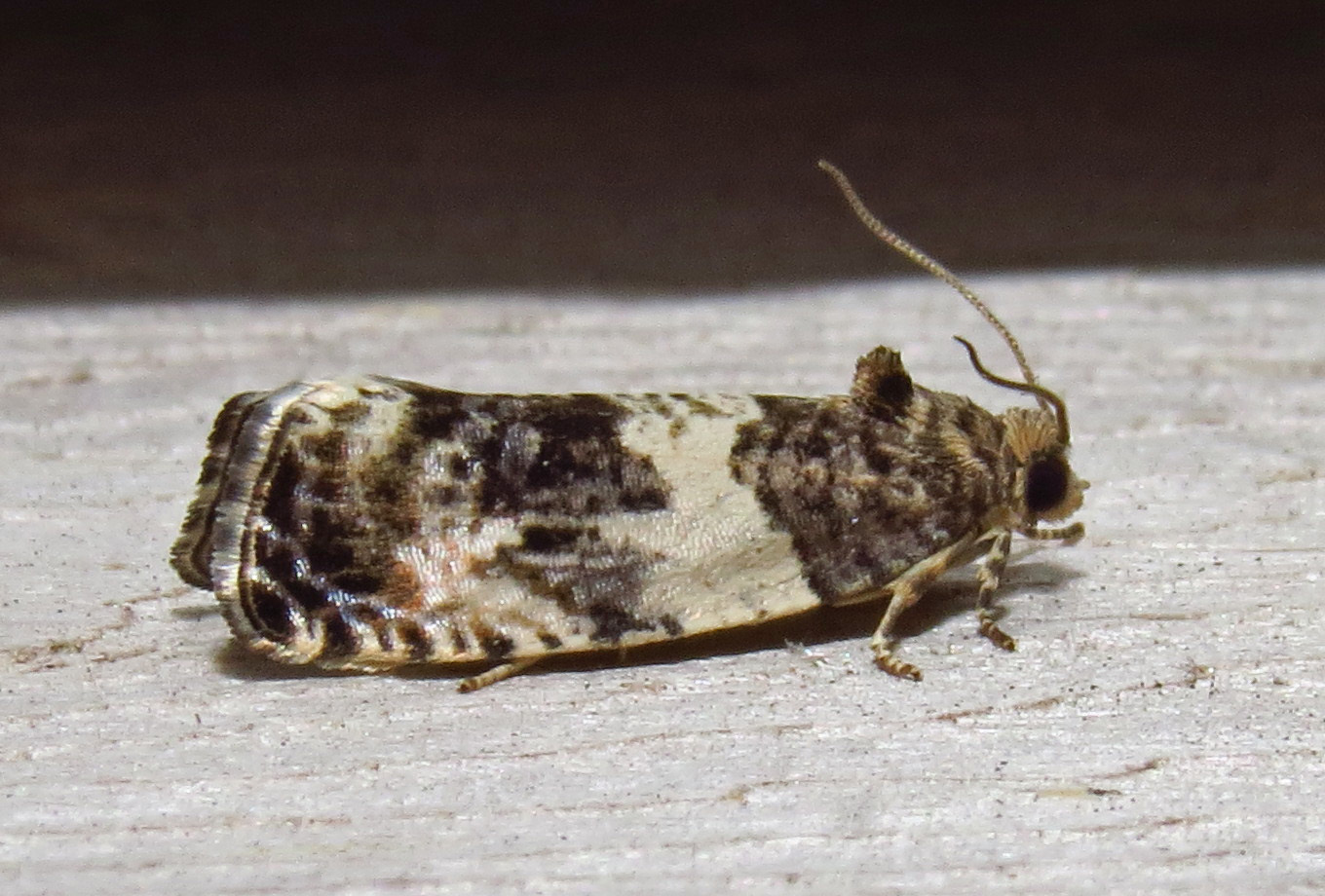

Scientific classification
- Domain: Eukaryota
- Kingdom: Animalia
- Phylum: Arthropoda
- Class: Insecta
- Order: Lepidoptera
- Family: Tortricidae
- Genus: Pseudosciaphila
- Species: P. duplex

Binomial name
- Pseudosciaphila duplex (Walsingham, 1905)

Synonyms
- Penthina duplex Walsingham, 1905; Argyroploce thallasana McDunnough, 1922

= Pseudosciaphila duplex =

Species of moth

Pseudosciaphila duplex, the aspen leaftier, poplar leafroller or spotted aspen leafroller, is a moth of the family Tortricidae. It is found in North America from Quebec and New England to northern California and British Columbia.

The wingspan is 20–25 mm. Adults are on wing from June to August.

The larvae feed on the leaves of poplar, birch and willow.

== Gallery ==
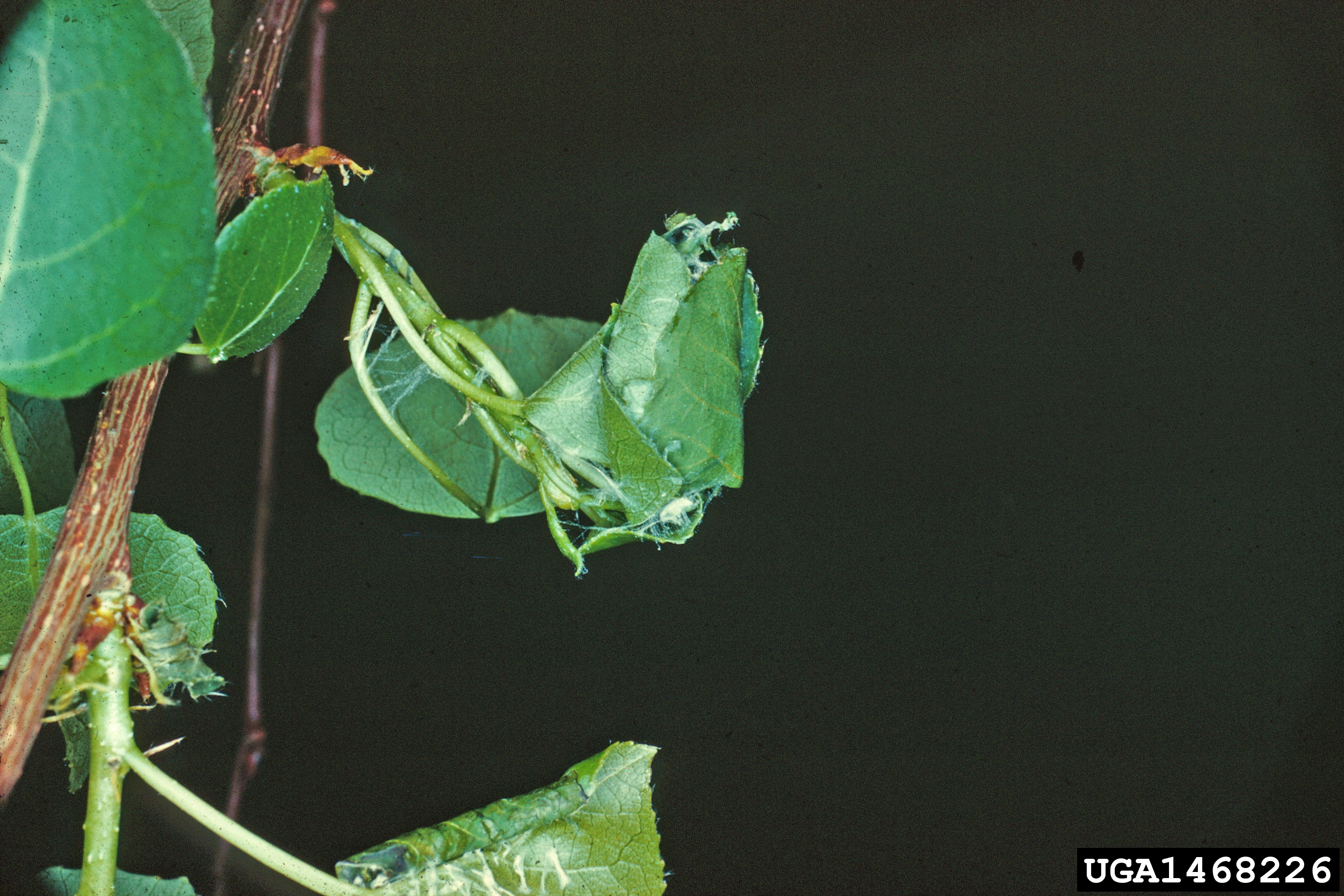
Damage

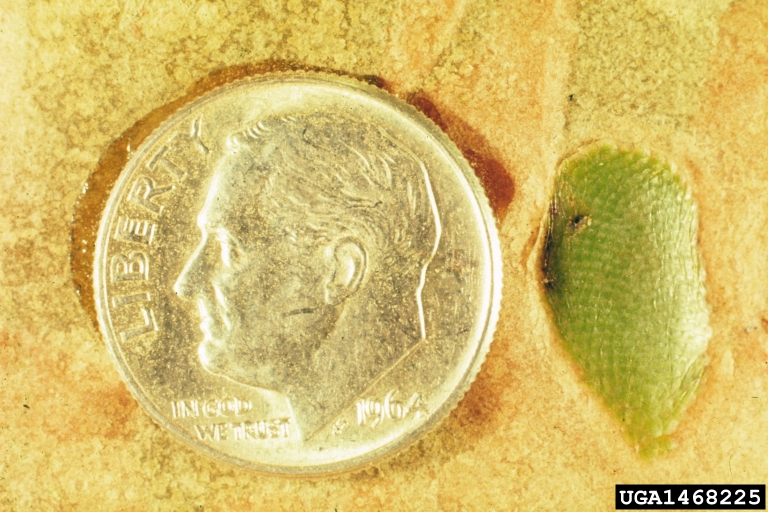
Egg

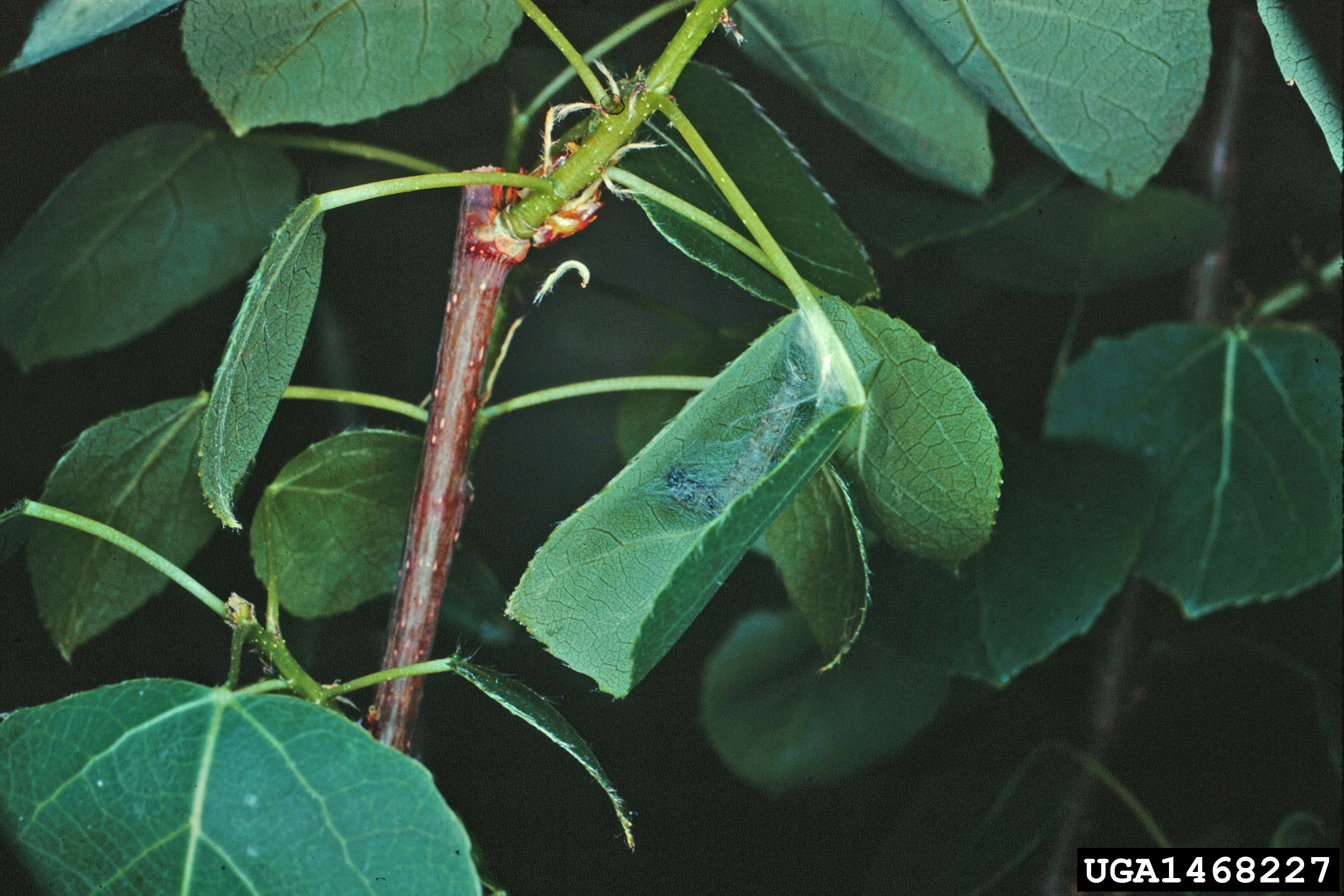
Larva
