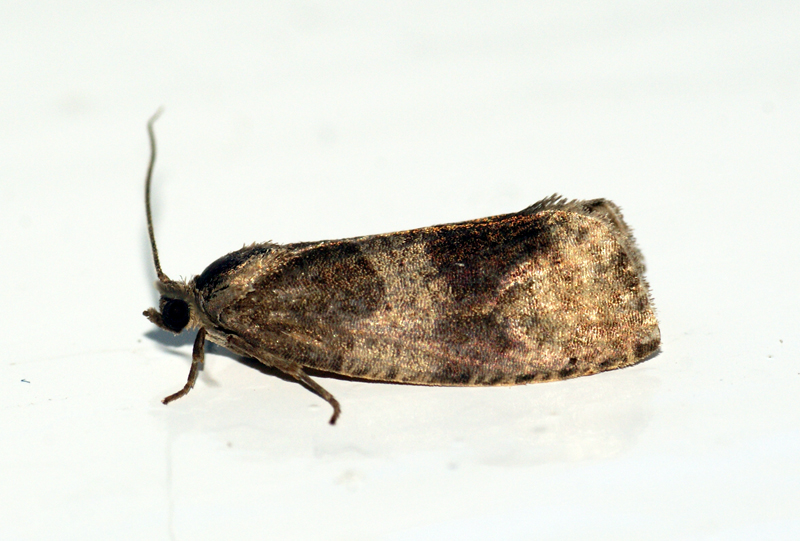
- Pseudosciaphila branderiana

Scientific classification
- Domain: Eukaryota
- Kingdom: Animalia
- Phylum: Arthropoda
- Class: Insecta
- Order: Lepidoptera
- Family: Tortricidae
- Tribe: Olethreutini
- Genus: Pseudosciaphila; Obraztsov, 1966

= Pseudosciaphila =

Genus of tortrix moths

Pseudosciaphila is a genus of moths belonging to the subfamily Olethreutinae of the family Tortricidae.

== Species ==
- Pseudosciaphila branderiana (Linnaeus, 1758)
- Pseudosciaphila duplex (Walsingham, 1905)

== See also ==
- List of Tortricidae genera
