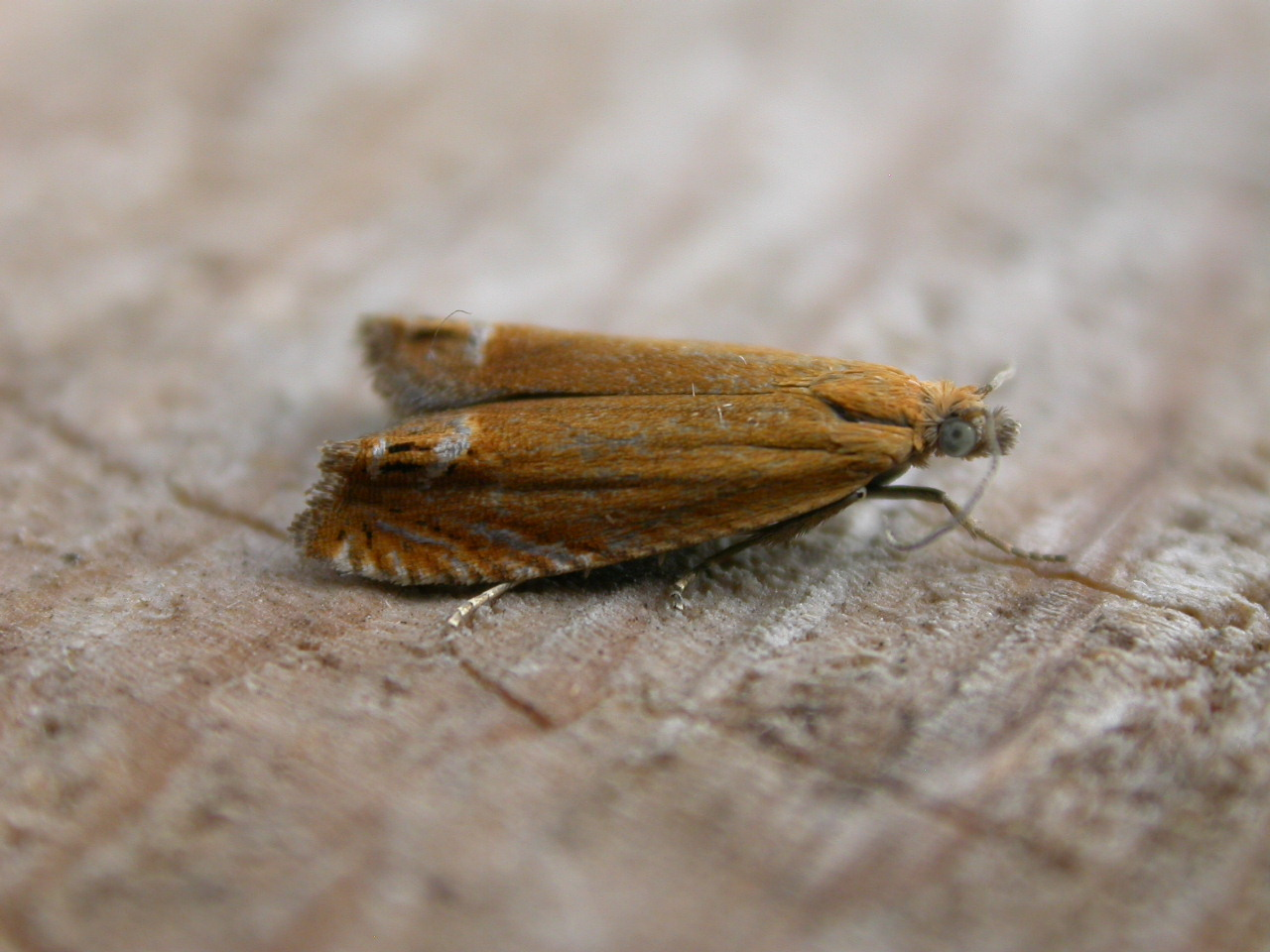
- Lathronympha strigana

Scientific classification
- Domain: Eukaryota
- Kingdom: Animalia
- Phylum: Arthropoda
- Class: Insecta
- Order: Lepidoptera
- Family: Tortricidae
- Subfamily: Olethreutinae
- Genus: Lathronympha; Meyrick, 1926

= Lathronympha =

Genus of tortrix moths

Lathronympha is a genus of moths belonging to the subfamily Olethreutinae of the family Tortricidae.

== Species ==
- Lathronympha albimacula Kuznetzov, 1962
- Lathronympha balearici Diakonoff, 1972
- Lathronympha christenseni Aarvik & Karsholt, 1993
- Lathronympha irrita Meyrick, in Caradja & Meyrick, 1935
- Lathronympha sardinica Trematerra, 1995
- Lathronympha strigana (Fabricius, 1775)

== See also ==
- List of Tortricidae genera
