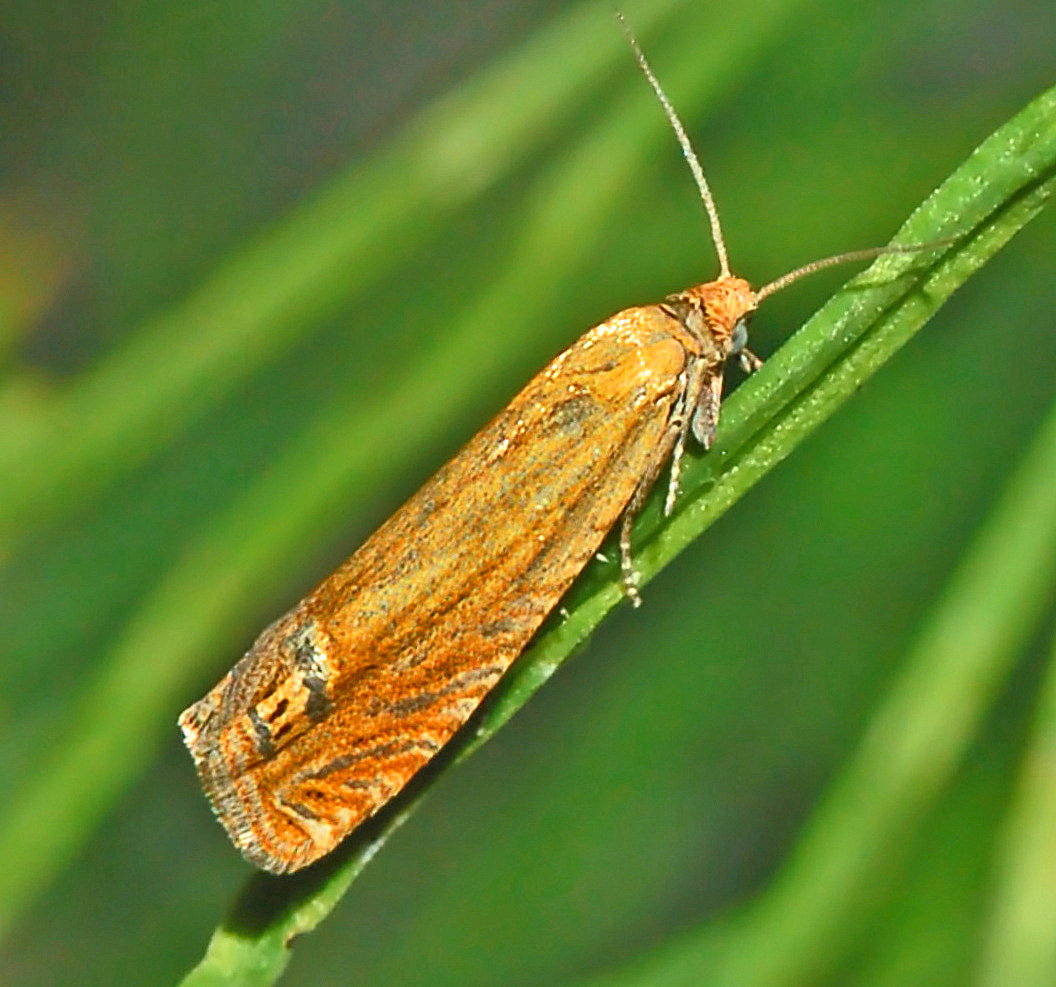

Scientific classification
- Kingdom: Animalia
- Phylum: Arthropoda
- Class: Insecta
- Order: Lepidoptera
- Family: Tortricidae
- Genus: Lathronympha
- Species: L. strigana

Binomial name
- Lathronympha strigana (Fabricius, 1775)

Synonyms
- Lathronympha hypericana Hübner

= Lathronympha strigana =

Species of moth

Lathronympha strigana is a species of moth in the family Tortricidae.

== Description ==
Lathronympha strigana is a medium-sized moth with a wingspan of 14–18 mm. The basic color of the wings is light reddish brown. The forewings have a few light lines at the wing tip and two silver cross bars in the outer rear section. Adults are on wing from June to July, sometimes with a second generation in late August or September. The larvae are a little flat, gray green with darker spots and a maroon head. They feed on Hypericum species (St. John's worts).

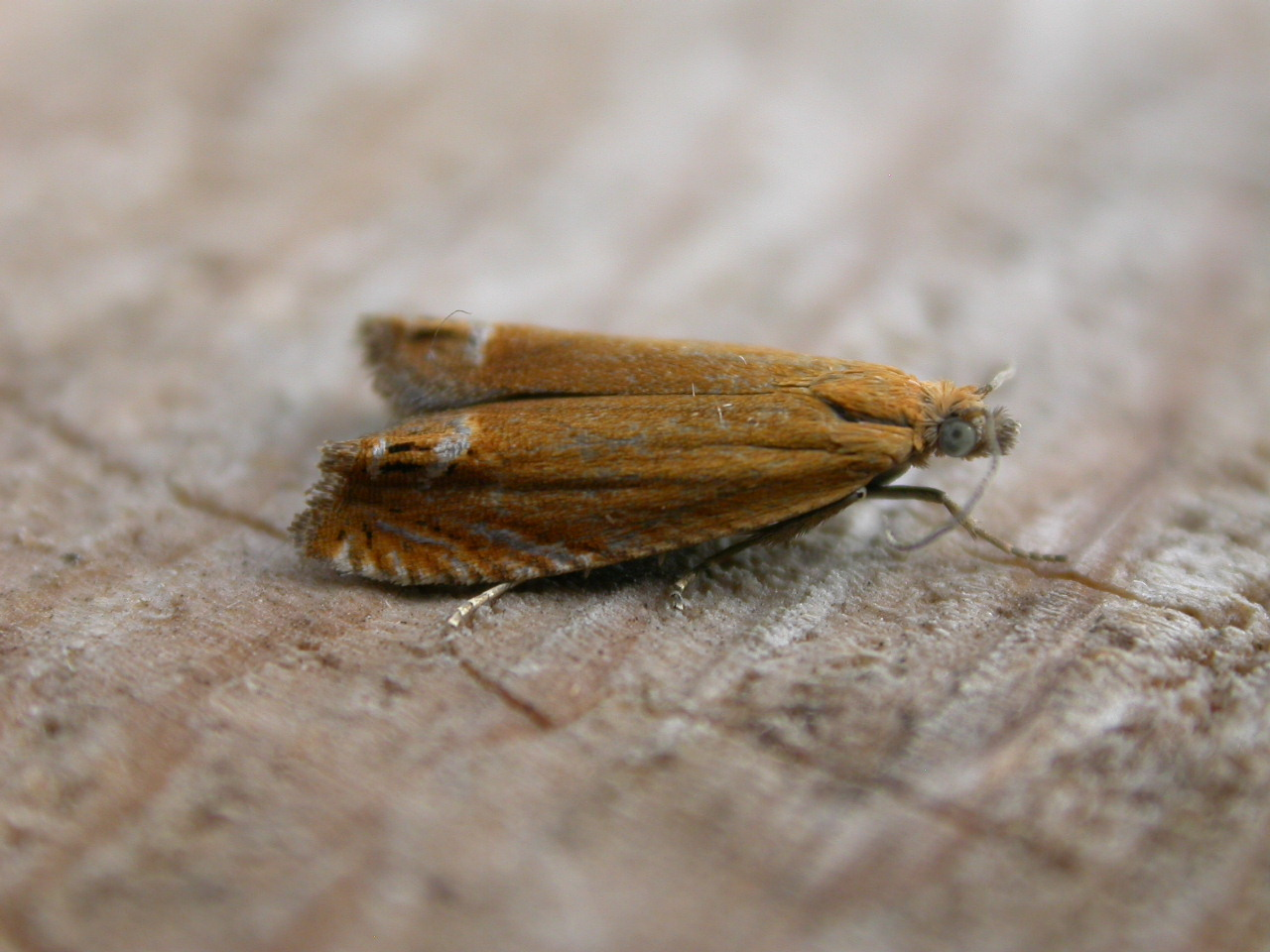
Adult

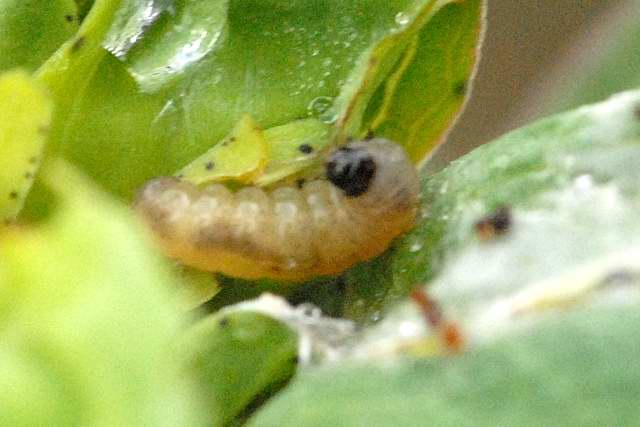
Larva

== Distribution ==
This species can be found in most of Europe, except in the far north, and in northern Asia.

== Habitat ==
Lathronympha strigana prefers open forests, roadsides and other places where the host plant grows.
