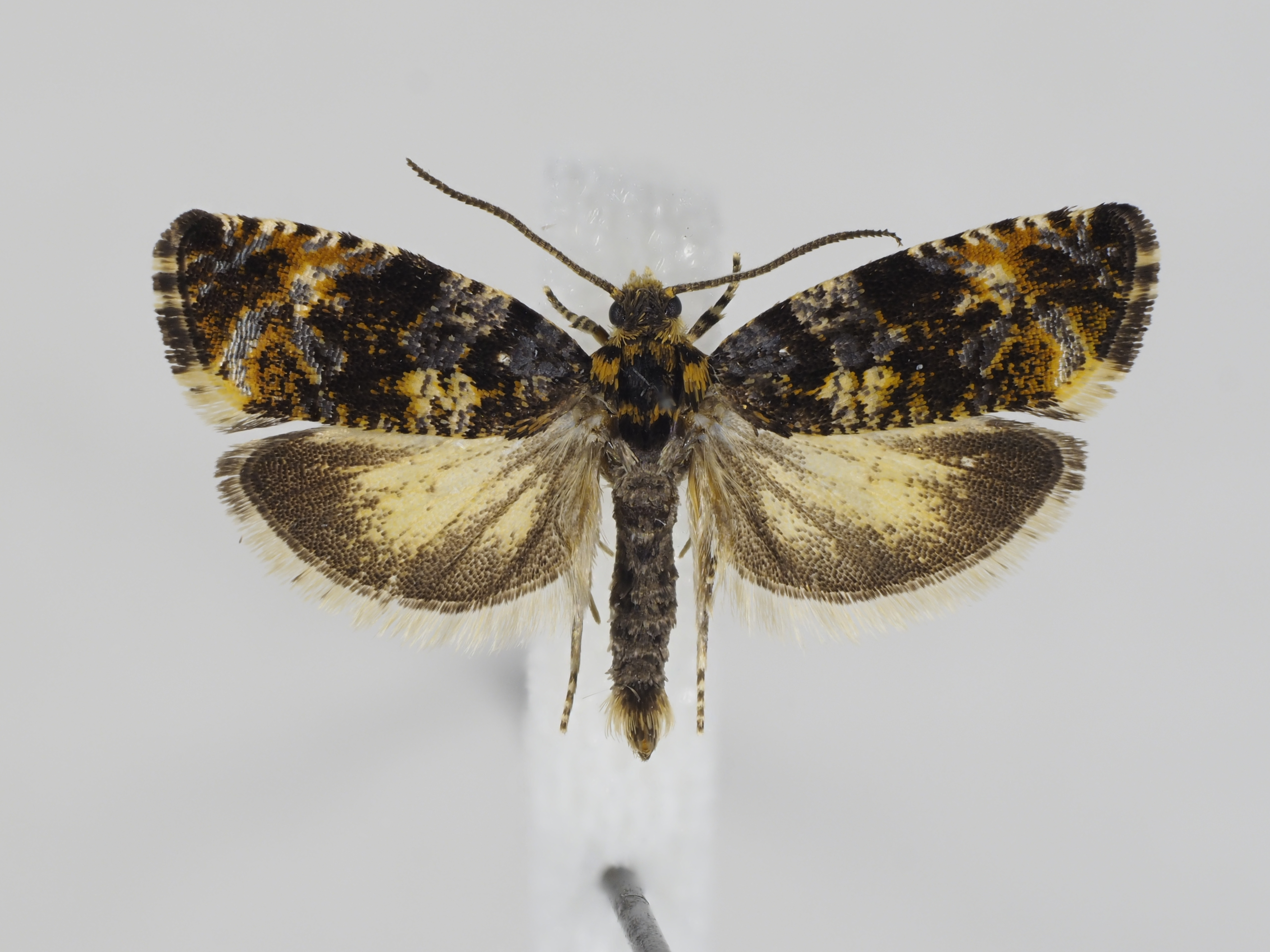

Scientific classification
- Kingdom: Animalia
- Phylum: Arthropoda
- Class: Insecta
- Order: Lepidoptera
- Family: Tortricidae
- Genus: Pristerognatha
- Species: P. penthinana

Binomial name
- Pristerognatha penthinana (Guenée, 1845)

= Pristerognatha penthinana =

Species of moth

Pristerognatha penthinana is a moth belonging to the family Tortricidae. The species was first described by Achille Guenée in 1845.

It is native to Eurasia.
