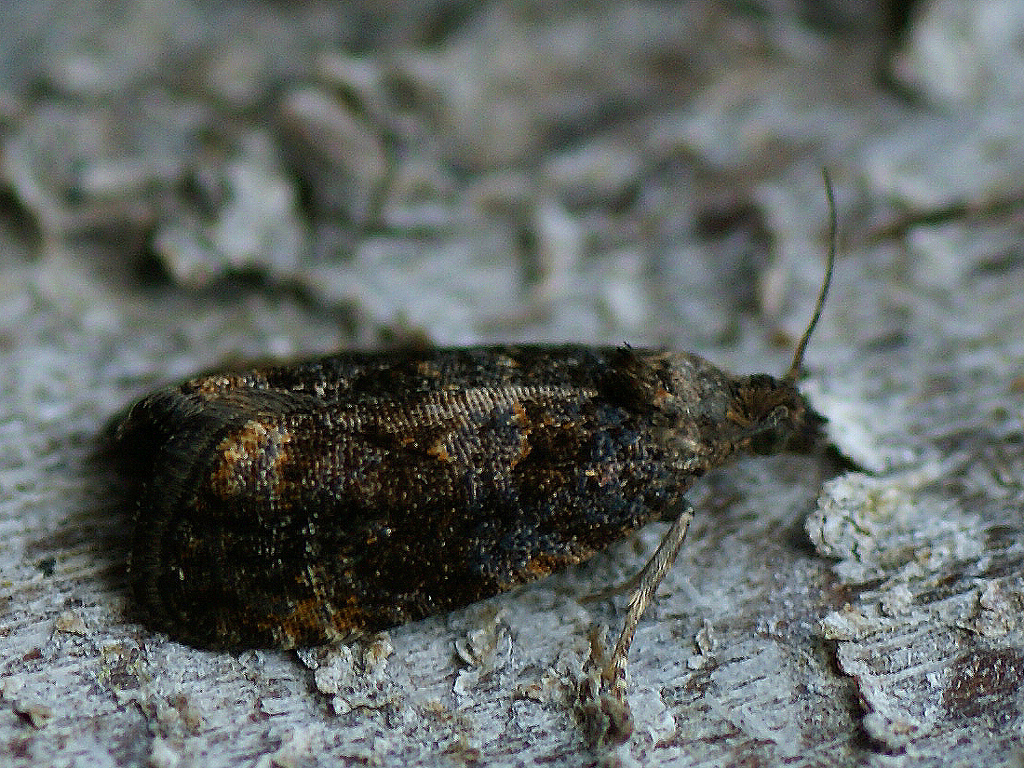
- Pristerognatha fuligana

Scientific classification
- Kingdom: Animalia
- Phylum: Arthropoda
- Class: Insecta
- Order: Lepidoptera
- Family: Tortricidae
- Subfamily: Olethreutinae
- Genus: Pristerognatha; Obraztsov, 1960

= Pristerognatha =

Genus of tortrix moths

Pristerognatha is a genus of moths belonging to the subfamily Olethreutinae of the family Tortricidae.

== Species ==
- Pristerognatha agilana (Clemens, 1860)
- Pristerognatha fuligana ([Denis & Schiffermuller], 1775)
- Pristerognatha penthinana (Guenee, 1845)

== See also ==
- List of Tortricidae genera
