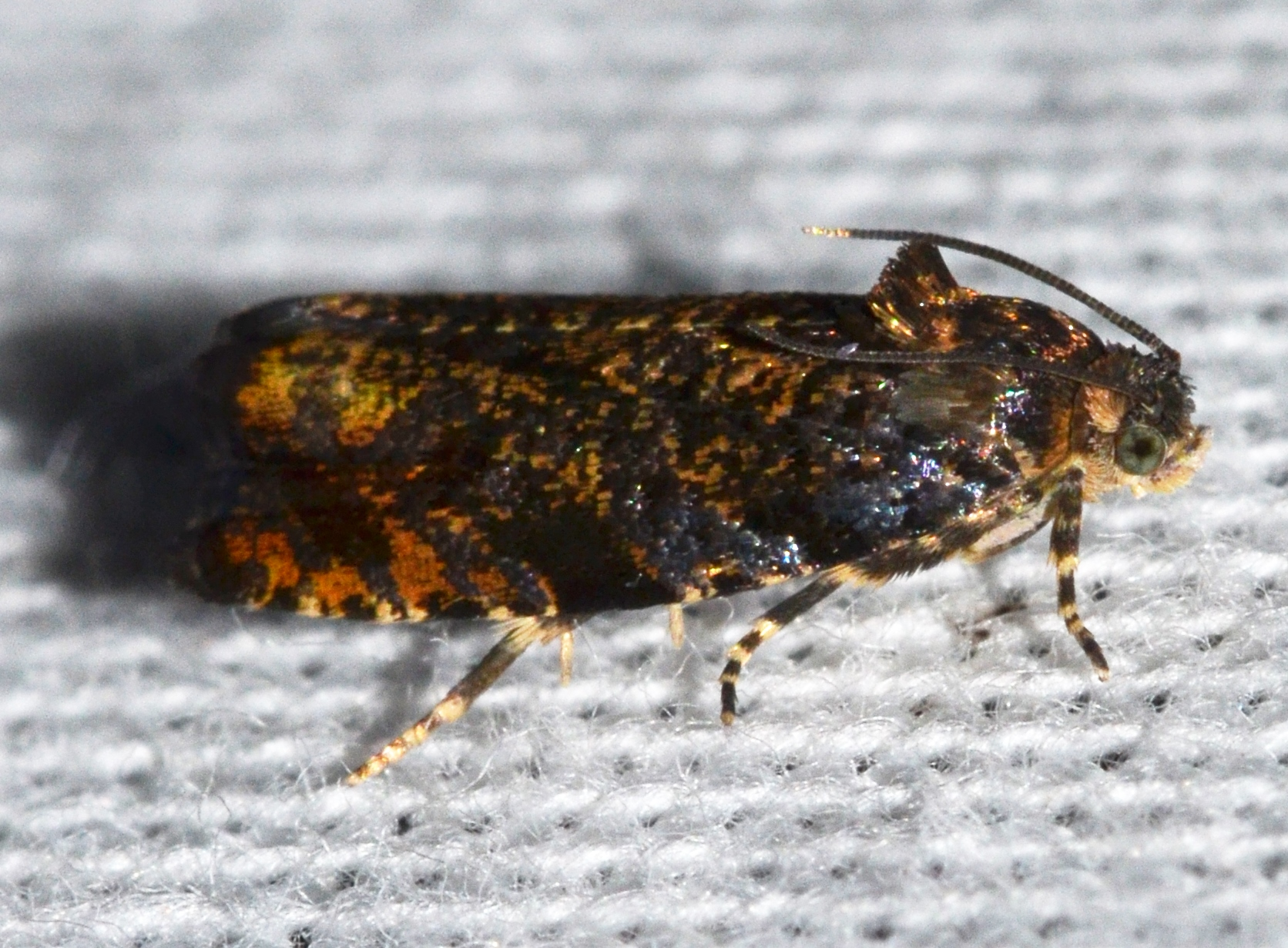

Scientific classification
- Kingdom: Animalia
- Phylum: Arthropoda
- Class: Insecta
- Order: Lepidoptera
- Family: Tortricidae
- Genus: Pristerognatha
- Species: P. fuligana

Binomial name
- Pristerognatha fuligana (Denis & Schiffermüller, 1775)

= Pristerognatha fuligana =

Species of moth

Pristerognatha fuligana is a moth belonging to the family Tortricidae. The species was first described by Michael Denis and Ignaz Schiffermüller in 1775.

It is native to Eurasia and Northern America.
