= Dactylioglypha pallens =

Scientific classification
- Domain: Eukaryota
- Kingdom: Animalia
- Phylum: Arthropoda
- Class: Insecta
- Order: Lepidoptera
- Family: Tortricidae
- Genus: Dactylioglypha
- Species: D. pallens

Binomial name
- Dactylioglypha pallens Diakonoff, 1973

Species of moth

Dactylioglypha pallens is a moth of the family Tortricidae. It is found in Thailand and western Java.
