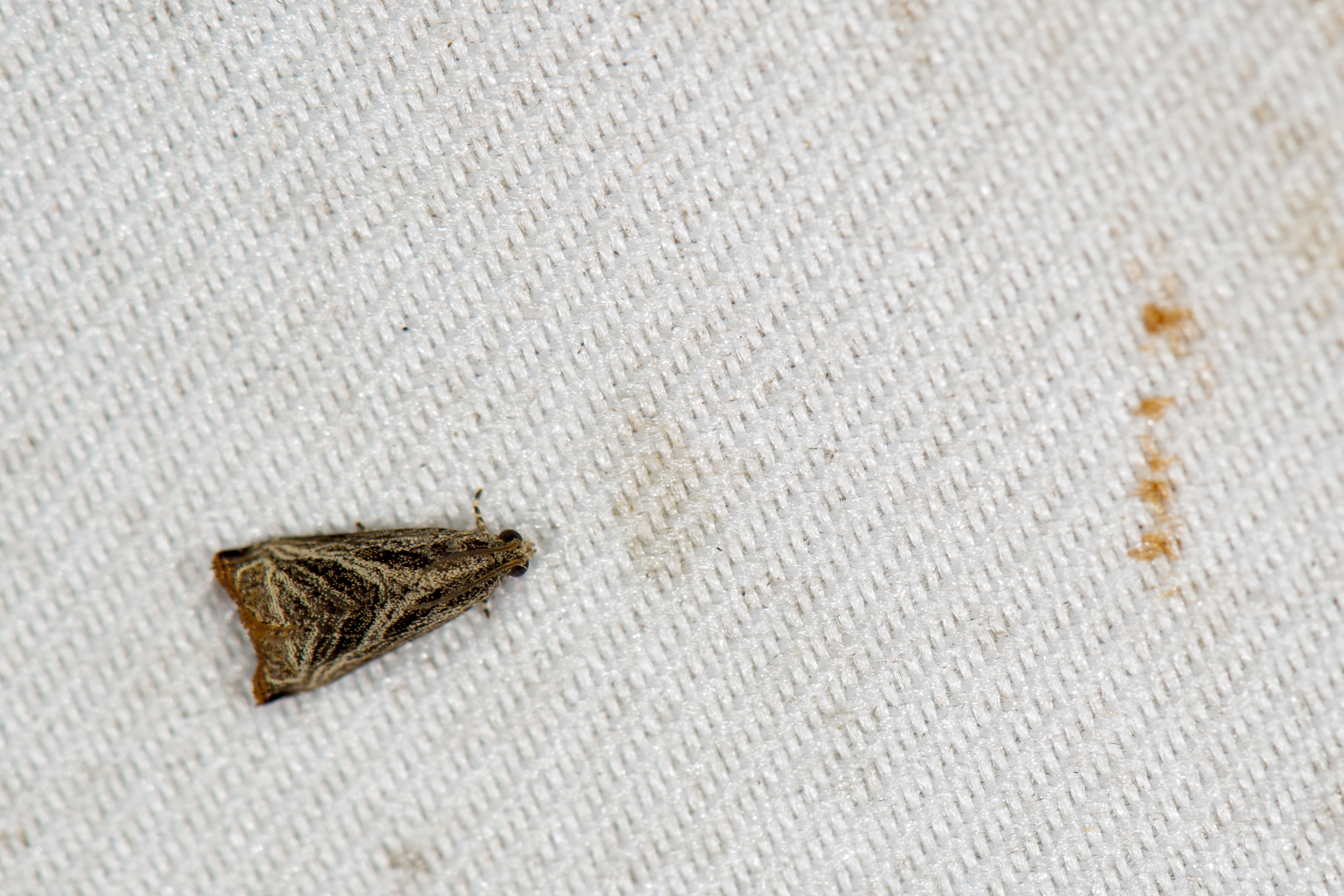

Scientific classification
- Kingdom: Animalia
- Phylum: Arthropoda
- Class: Insecta
- Order: Lepidoptera
- Family: Tortricidae
- Genus: Dactylioglypha
- Species: D. tonica

Binomial name
- Dactylioglypha tonica (Meyrick, 1909)

Synonyms
- Argyroploce tonica Meyrick, 1909; Olethreutes tonica Clarke, 1958; Lipsotelus tonica Issiki, in Esaki, 1957; Dactylioglypha tonica Diakonoff, 1973

= Dactylioglypha tonica =

Species of moth

Dactylioglypha tonica is a moth of the family Tortricidae. It is found in Thailand, Japan, Malaysia, Taiwan, Sri Lanka and Australia.

The wingspan is about 12 mm.
