= Dactylioglypha =

Scientific classification
- Domain: Eukaryota
- Kingdom: Animalia
- Phylum: Arthropoda
- Class: Insecta
- Order: Lepidoptera
- Family: Tortricidae
- Tribe: Olethreutini
- Genus: Dactylioglypha; Diakonoff, 1973

Genus of tortrix moths

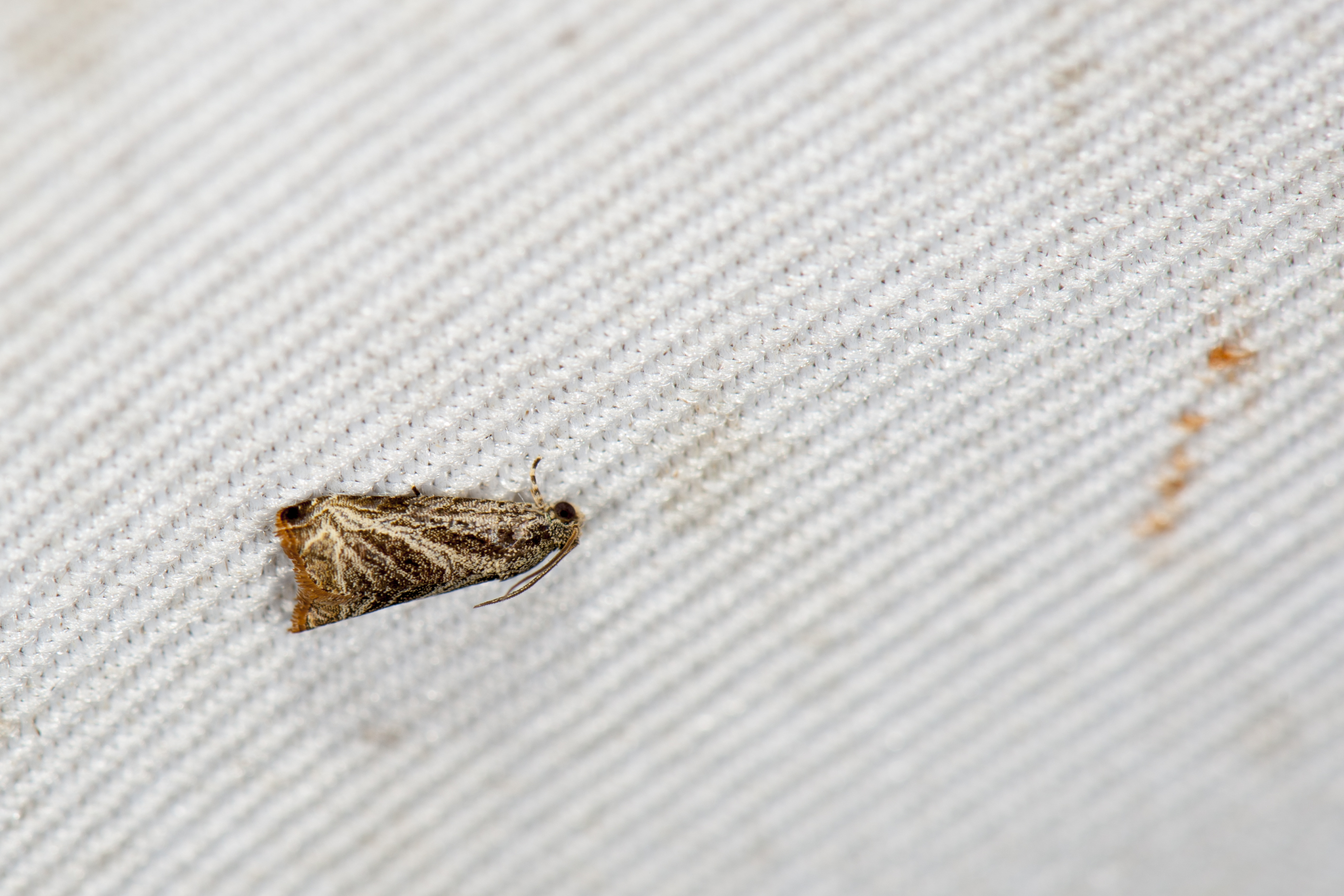

Dactylioglypha is a genus of moths belonging to the subfamily Olethreutinae of the family Tortricidae.

== Species ==
- Dactylioglypha avita Diakonoff, 1973
- Dactylioglypha mimas Diakonoff, 1973
- Dactylioglypha pallens Diakonoff, 1973
- Dactylioglypha tonica (Meyrick, 1909)
- Dactylioglypha zonata Diakonoff, 1973

== See also ==
- List of Tortricidae genera
