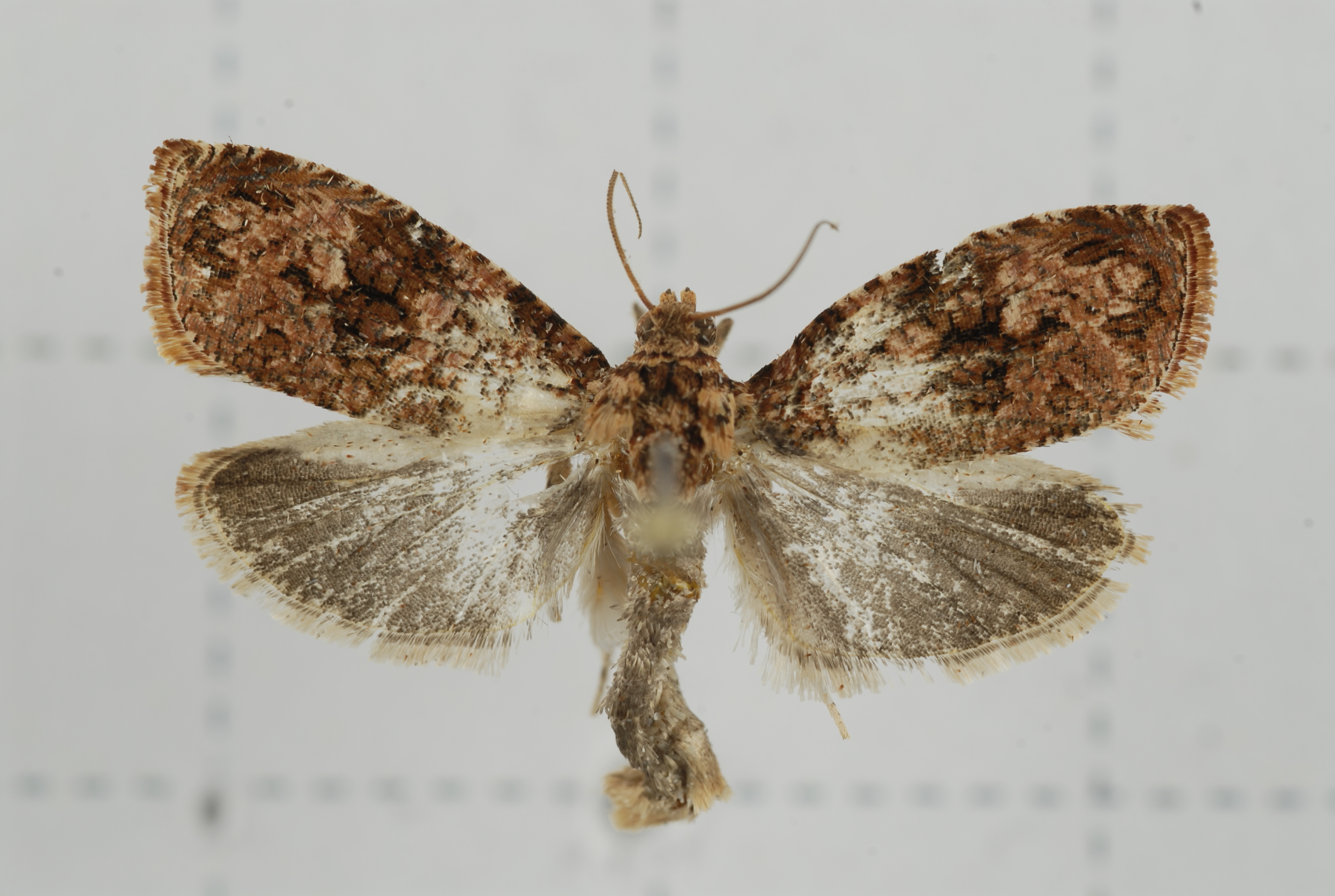

Scientific classification
- Domain: Eukaryota
- Kingdom: Animalia
- Phylum: Arthropoda
- Class: Insecta
- Order: Lepidoptera
- Family: Tortricidae
- Tribe: Olethreutini
- Genus: Phaecadophora; Walsingham, 1900

= Phaecadophora =

Genus of tortrix moths

Phaecadophora is a genus of moths belonging to the subfamily Olethreutinae of the family Tortricidae.

== Species ==
- Phaecadophora acutana Walsingham, 1900
- Phaecadophora fimbriata Walsingham, 1900

== See also ==
- List of Tortricidae genera
