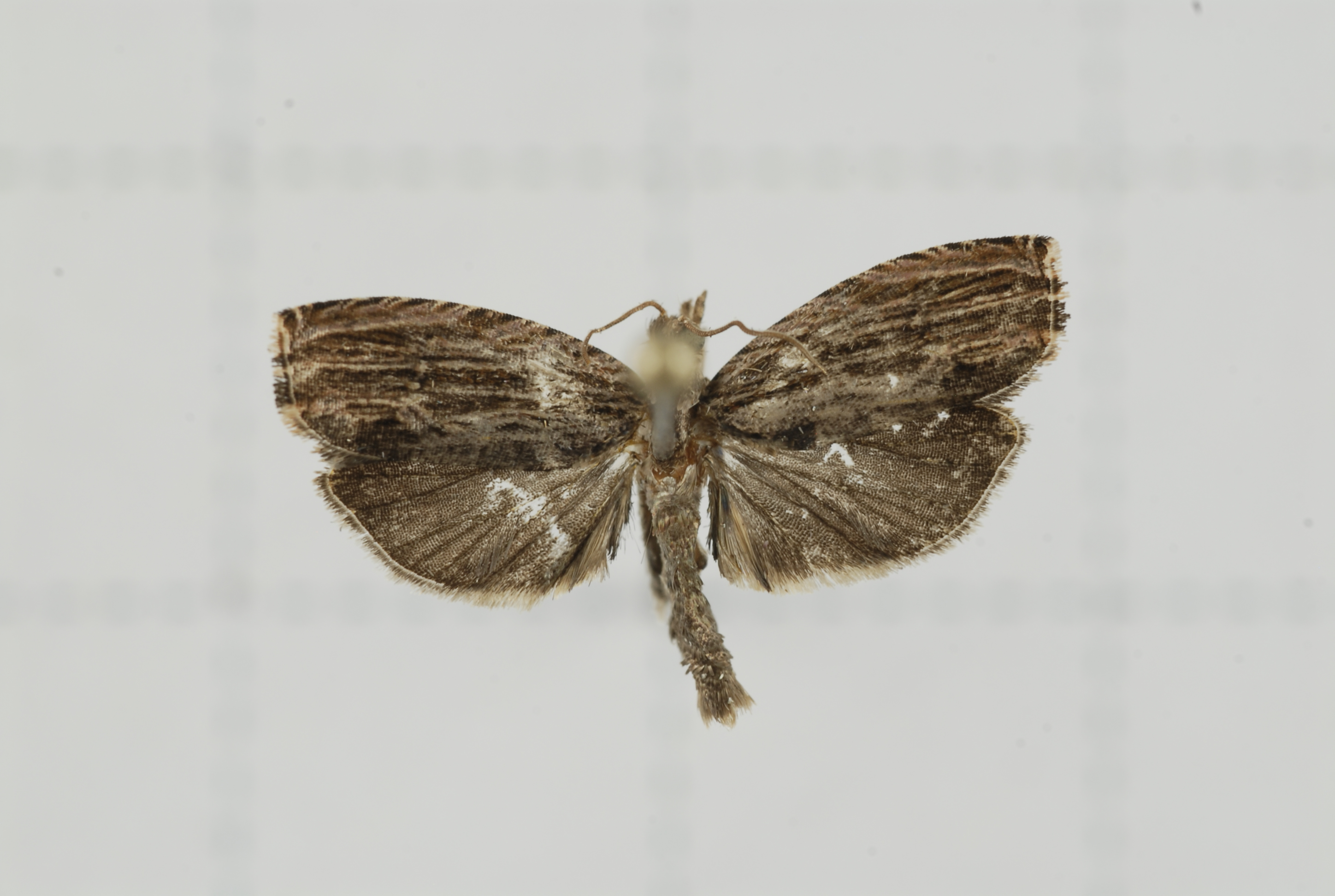

Scientific classification
- Domain: Eukaryota
- Kingdom: Animalia
- Phylum: Arthropoda
- Class: Insecta
- Order: Lepidoptera
- Family: Tortricidae
- Genus: Phaecadophora
- Species: P. fimbriata

Binomial name
- Phaecadophora fimbriata Walsingham, 1900

Synonyms
- Argyroploce metactenis Meyrick, 1909; Argyroploce eucrossa Meyrick, 1914; Argyroploce eaolotechna Meyrick, 1935; Argyroploce leucocteis Diakonoff, 1953

= Phaecadophora fimbriata =

Species of moth

Phaecadophora fimbriata is a moth of the family Tortricidae. It is found in Thailand, Japan, Taiwan, China, India, Java and New Guinea.

The wingspan is 20 mm.
