= Metrioglypha viridicosta =

Scientific classification
- Domain: Eukaryota
- Kingdom: Animalia
- Phylum: Arthropoda
- Class: Insecta
- Order: Lepidoptera
- Family: Tortricidae
- Genus: Metrioglypha
- Species: M. viridicosta

Binomial name
- Metrioglypha viridicosta Razowski, 2009

Species of moth

Metrioglypha viridicosta is a moth of the family Tortricidae. It is found in Vietnam.

The wingspan is 21 mm.
