= Metrioglypha =

Scientific classification
- Domain: Eukaryota
- Kingdom: Animalia
- Phylum: Arthropoda
- Class: Insecta
- Order: Lepidoptera
- Family: Tortricidae
- Tribe: Olethreutini
- Genus: Metrioglypha; Diakonoff, 1966

Genus of tortrix moths

Metrioglypha is a genus of moths belonging to the subfamily Olethreutinae of the family Tortricidae.

== Species ==
- Metrioglypha aoriphora Diakonoff, 1973
- Metrioglypha circulata (Diakonoff, 1966)
- Metrioglypha confertana (Walker, 1863)
- Metrioglypha crassa Diakonoff, 1973
- Metrioglypha dualis Diakonoff, 1973
- Metrioglypha empalinopa Diakonoff, 1973
- Metrioglypha gemmarius Diakonoff, 1973
- Metrioglypha habilis Diakonoff, 1973
- Metrioglypha ithuncus Razowski, 2013
- Metrioglypha onychosema (Meyrick, 1931)
- Metrioglypha phyllodes (Lower, 1899)
- Metrioglypha thystas (Meyrick, 1911)
- Metrioglypha viridicosta Razowski, 2009

== See also ==
- List of Tortricidae genera
