= Metrioglypha confertana =

Scientific classification
- Kingdom: Animalia
- Phylum: Arthropoda
- Class: Insecta
- Order: Lepidoptera
- Family: Tortricidae
- Genus: Metrioglypha
- Species: M. confertana

Binomial name
- Metrioglypha confertana (Walker, 1863)

Synonyms
- Grapholitha confertana Walker, 1863; Grapholitha vulgana Walker, 1866; ? Argyroploce claviculata Meyrick, 1909; Argyroploce confertana Meyrick, 1911; Metrioglypha vulgana Diakonoff, 1966

Species of moth

Metrioglypha confertana is a moth of the family Tortricidae first described by Francis Walker in 1864. It is found in India, Sri Lanka and New Guinea.
