= Metrioglypha ithuncus =

Scientific classification
- Kingdom: Animalia
- Phylum: Arthropoda
- Class: Insecta
- Order: Lepidoptera
- Family: Tortricidae
- Genus: Metrioglypha
- Species: M. ithuncus

Binomial name
- Metrioglypha ithuncus Razowski, 2013

Species of moth

Metrioglypha ithuncus is a species of moth of the family Tortricidae first described by Józef Razowski in 2013. It is found on Seram Island in Indonesia. The habitat consists of secondary forests.

The wingspan is about 16 mm.
