= Dicephalarcha herbosa =

Scientific classification
- Kingdom: Animalia
- Phylum: Arthropoda
- Class: Insecta
- Order: Lepidoptera
- Family: Tortricidae
- Genus: Dicephalarcha
- Species: D. herbosa

Binomial name
- Dicephalarcha herbosa (Meyrick, 1909)

Synonyms
- Argyroploce herbosa Meyrick, 1909; Olethreutes herbosa; Argyroploce mniopyrrha Meyrick, 1931

Species of moth

Dicephalarcha herbosa is a moth of the family Tortricidae. It is found in Thailand, India, southern Sulawesi, Java, Borneo, Bali and the Moluccas.

The wingspan 10–13 mm.
