= Dicephalarcha =

Scientific classification
- Domain: Eukaryota
- Kingdom: Animalia
- Phylum: Arthropoda
- Class: Insecta
- Order: Lepidoptera
- Family: Tortricidae
- Tribe: Olethreutini
- Genus: Dicephalarcha; Diakonoff, 1973

Genus of tortrix moths

Dicephalarcha is a genus of moths belonging to the subfamily Olethreutinae of the family Tortricidae.

== Species ==
- Dicephalarcha acupicta Diakonoff, 1973
- Dicephalarcha anemodes (Meyrick, 1912)
- Dicephalarcha atava Diakonoff, 1973
- Dicephalarcha dependens (Meyrick, 1922)
- Dicephalarcha dimorpha (Meyrick, 1909)
- Dicephalarcha herbosa (Meyrick, 1909)
- Dicephalarcha monometalla Diakonoff, 1973
- Dicephalarcha sicca Diakonoff, 1973

== See also ==
- List of Tortricidae genera
