= Dicephalarcha anemodes =

Scientific classification
- Kingdom: Animalia
- Phylum: Arthropoda
- Class: Insecta
- Order: Lepidoptera
- Family: Tortricidae
- Genus: Dicephalarcha
- Species: D. anemodes

Binomial name
- Dicephalarcha anemodes (Meyrick, 1912)

Synonyms
- Argyroploce anemodes Meyrick, 1922

Species of moth

Dicephalarcha anemodes is a moth of the family Tortricidae first described by Edward Meyrick in 1912. It is found in Sri Lanka.
