= Asaphistis omora =

Scientific classification
- Kingdom: Animalia
- Phylum: Arthropoda
- Class: Insecta
- Order: Lepidoptera
- Family: Tortricidae
- Genus: Asaphistis
- Species: A. omora

Binomial name
- Asaphistis omora Razowski, 2013

Species of moth

Asaphistis omora is a species of moth of the family Tortricidae first described by Józef Razowski in 2013. It is found on Seram in Indonesia. The habitat consists of upper montane forests.

The wingspan is about 20 mm.
