= Asaphistis =

Scientific classification
- Domain: Eukaryota
- Kingdom: Animalia
- Phylum: Arthropoda
- Class: Insecta
- Order: Lepidoptera
- Family: Tortricidae
- Tribe: Olethreutini
- Genus: Asaphistis; Meyrick, 1909

Synonyms
- Metaschistis Diakonoff, 1953

Genus of tortrix moths

Asaphistis is a genus of moths belonging to the subfamily Olethreutinae of the family Tortricidae. The genus was erected by Edward Meyrick in 1909.

== Species ==
The genus includes the following species:

- Asaphistis asema Diakonoff, 1973
- Asaphistis catarrhactopa (Meyrick, 1938)
- Asaphistis cretata Diakonoff, 1953
- Asaphistis gypsopa Diakonoff, 1953
- Asaphistis haematina Diakonoff, 1953
- Asaphistis hemicapnodes Diakonoff, 1953
- Asaphistis hemicyclica Diakonoff, 1953
- Asaphistis lucifera Meyrick, 1909
- Asaphistis maturicolor Diakonoff, 1973
- Asaphistis nobilis Diakonoff, 1973
- Asaphistis omora Razowski, 2013
- Asaphistis phanerops Diakonoff, 1973
- Asaphistis praeceps Meyrick, 1909
- Asaphistis protosema Diakonoff, 1973
- Asaphistis purpurescens Diakonoff, 1953
- Asaphistis sappiroflua Diakonoff, 1953

== See also ==
- List of Tortricidae genera
