= Rhectogonia sandrae =

Scientific classification
- Kingdom: Animalia
- Phylum: Arthropoda
- Class: Insecta
- Order: Lepidoptera
- Family: Tortricidae
- Genus: Rhectogonia
- Species: R. sandrae

Binomial name
- Rhectogonia sandrae Razowski, 2013

Species of moth

Rhectogonia sandrae is a species of moth of the family Tortricidae first described by Józef Razowski in 2013. It is found on Seram in Indonesia. The habitat consists of lower montane forests.

The wingspan is about 16.5 mm.
