= Rhectogonia ancalota =

Scientific classification
- Domain: Eukaryota
- Kingdom: Animalia
- Phylum: Arthropoda
- Class: Insecta
- Order: Lepidoptera
- Family: Tortricidae
- Genus: Rhectogonia
- Species: R. ancalota

Binomial name
- Rhectogonia ancalota (Meyrick, 1907)

Synonyms
- Enarmonia ancalota Meyrick, 1907; Rhectogonia ancalota Diakonoff, 1966

Species of moth

Rhectogonia ancalota is a moth of the family Tortricidae first described by Edward Meyrick in 1907. It is found in Sri Lanka.
