= Rhectogonia =

Scientific classification
- Domain: Eukaryota
- Kingdom: Animalia
- Phylum: Arthropoda
- Class: Insecta
- Order: Lepidoptera
- Family: Tortricidae
- Subfamily: Olethreutinae
- Tribe: Olethreutini
- Genus: Rhectogonia; Diakonoff, 1966

Genus of tortrix moths

Rhectogonia is a genus of moths belonging to the subfamily Olethreutinae of the family Tortricidae.

== Species ==
- Rhectogonia ancalota (Meyrick, 1907)
- Rhectogonia dyschima Diakonoff, 1984
- Rhectogonia electrosema Diakonoff, 1966
- Rhectogonia sandrae Razowski, 2013

== See also ==
- List of Tortricidae genera
