= Neostatherotis =

Scientific classification
- Domain: Eukaryota
- Kingdom: Animalia
- Phylum: Arthropoda
- Class: Insecta
- Order: Lepidoptera
- Family: Tortricidae
- Tribe: Olethreutini
- Genus: Neostatherotis; Oku, 1974

Genus of tortrix moths

Neostatherotis is a genus of moths belonging to the subfamily Olethreutinae of the family Tortricidae.

== Species ==
- Neostatherotis nipponica Oku, 1974
- Neostatherotis pallidtornus Razowski, 2008
- Neostatherotis vietnamica Razowski, 2008

== See also ==
- List of Tortricidae genera
