= Neostatherotis pallidtornus =

Scientific classification
- Domain: Eukaryota
- Kingdom: Animalia
- Phylum: Arthropoda
- Class: Insecta
- Order: Lepidoptera
- Family: Tortricidae
- Genus: Neostatherotis
- Species: N. pallidtornus

Binomial name
- Neostatherotis pallidtornus Razowski, 2008

Species of moth

Neostatherotis pallidtornus is a moth of the family Tortricidae. It is found in Vietnam.

Average wingspan is 20 mm.
