= Neostatherotis vietnamica =

Scientific classification
- Domain: Eukaryota
- Kingdom: Animalia
- Phylum: Arthropoda
- Class: Insecta
- Order: Lepidoptera
- Family: Tortricidae
- Genus: Neostatherotis
- Species: N. vietnamica

Binomial name
- Neostatherotis vietnamica Razowski, 2008

Species of moth

Neostatherotis vietnamica is a moth of the family Tortricidae. It is found in Vietnam.

The wingspan is 22 mm.

== Etymology ==
The name refers to native country of the holotype.
