= Psilacantha =

Scientific classification
- Kingdom: Animalia
- Phylum: Arthropoda
- Class: Insecta
- Order: Lepidoptera
- Family: Tortricidae
- Subfamily: Olethreutinae
- Genus: Psilacantha; Diakonoff, 1966

Genus of tortrix moths

Psilacantha is a genus of moths belonging to the subfamily Olethreutinae of the family Tortricidae.

== Species ==
- Psilacantha charidotis (Durrant, 1915)
- Psilacantha creserias (Meyrick, 1905)
- Psilacantha manifesta Diakonoff, 1973
- Psilacantha pryeri (Walsingham, 1900)
- Psilacantha spinosa Diakonoff, 1973

== See also ==
- List of Tortricidae genera
