= Psilacantha creserias =

Scientific classification
- Kingdom: Animalia
- Phylum: Arthropoda
- Class: Insecta
- Order: Lepidoptera
- Family: Tortricidae
- Genus: Psilacantha
- Species: P. creserias

Binomial name
- Psilacantha creserias (Meyrick, 1905)

Synonyms
- Platypeplus creserias Meyrick, 1905; Olethreutes creserias Clarke, 1958; Sycacantha (Psilacantha) creserias Diakonoff, 1966; Psilacantha creserias Diakonoff, 1973

Species of moth

Psilacantha creserias is a moth of the family Tortricidae first described by Edward Meyrick in 1905. It is found in India and Sri Lanka.
