= Proschistis =

Scientific classification
- Kingdom: Animalia
- Phylum: Arthropoda
- Class: Insecta
- Order: Lepidoptera
- Family: Tortricidae
- Tribe: Olethreutini
- Genus: Proschistis; Meyrick, 1907

Genus of tortrix moths

Proschistis is a genus of moths belonging to the subfamily Olethreutinae of the family Tortricidae.

== Species ==
- Proschistis amphibola Diakonoff, 1973
- Proschistis invida Meyrick, 1909
- Proschistis marmaropa (Meyrick, 1907)
- Proschistis petromacha (Meyrick, 1931)
- Proschistis polyochtha Diakonoff, 1973
- Proschistis sideroxyla (Meyrick, 1931)
- Proschistis stygnopa Meyrick, in Caradja & Meyrick, 1935
- Proschistis zaleuta Meyrick, 1907

== See also ==
- List of Tortricidae genera
