= Proschistis zaleuta =

Scientific classification
- Kingdom: Animalia
- Phylum: Arthropoda
- Clade: Pancrustacea
- Class: Insecta
- Order: Lepidoptera
- Family: Tortricidae
- Genus: Proschistis
- Species: P. zaleuta

Binomial name
- Proschistis zaleuta Meyrick, 1907

Species of moth

Proschistis zaleuta is a moth of the family Tortricidae first described by Edward Meyrick in 1907. It is found in Sri Lanka.
