= Archilobesia doboszi =

Scientific classification
- Kingdom: Animalia
- Phylum: Arthropoda
- Class: Insecta
- Order: Lepidoptera
- Family: Tortricidae
- Genus: Archilobesia
- Species: A. doboszi

Binomial name
- Archilobesia doboszi Razowski, 2013

Species of moth

Archilobesia doboszi is a species of moth of the family Tortricidae. It is found in New Caledonia in the southwest Pacific Ocean. The habitat consists of rainforests.

The wingspan is about 18 mm.

== Etymology ==
The species is named for Dr Ronald Dobosz, who collected the species.
