= Archilobesia =

Scientific classification
- Domain: Eukaryota
- Kingdom: Animalia
- Phylum: Arthropoda
- Class: Insecta
- Order: Lepidoptera
- Family: Tortricidae
- Tribe: Olethreutini
- Genus: Archilobesia; Diakonoff, 1966

Genus of tortrix moths

Archilobesia is a genus of moths belonging to the subfamily Olethreutinae of the family Tortricidae.

== Species ==
- Archilobesia chresta Diakonoff, 1973
- Archilobesia crossoleuca (Meyrick, 1933)
- Archilobesia doboszi Razowski, 2013
- Archilobesia drymoptila (Lower, 1920)
- Archilobesia formosana Diakonoff, 1973

== See also ==
- List of Tortricidae genera
