= Penthostola =

Scientific classification
- Kingdom: Animalia
- Phylum: Arthropoda
- Class: Insecta
- Order: Lepidoptera
- Family: Tortricidae
- Tribe: Olethreutini
- Genus: Penthostola; Diakonoff, 1978

Genus of tortrix moths

Penthostola is a genus of moths belonging to the subfamily Olethreutinae of the family Tortricidae.

== Species ==
- Penthostola albomaculatis (Liu & Bai, 1985)
- Penthostola diakonoffi Kawabe, 1995
- Penthostola hemeronyx (Diakonoff, 1953)
- Penthostola nigrantis Kawabe, 1995
- Penthostola semna Diakonoff, 1978
- Penthostola tricolorana Kuznetzov, 2000

== See also ==
- List of Tortricidae genera
