= Penthostola albomaculatis =

Scientific classification
- Kingdom: Animalia
- Phylum: Arthropoda
- Class: Insecta
- Order: Lepidoptera
- Family: Tortricidae
- Genus: Penthostola
- Species: P. albomaculatis

Binomial name
- Penthostola albomaculatis (Liu & Bai, 1985)

Synonyms
- Eudemis albomaculatis Liu & Bai, 1985

Species of moth

Penthostola albomaculatis is a moth of the family Tortricidae. It is found in Thailand and southern China.
