= Semniotes halantha =

Scientific classification
- Kingdom: Animalia
- Phylum: Arthropoda
- Class: Insecta
- Order: Lepidoptera
- Family: Tortricidae
- Genus: Semniotes
- Species: S. halantha

Binomial name
- Semniotes halantha (Meyrick, 1909)

Synonyms
- Argyroploce halantha Meyrick, 1909

Species of moth

Semniotes halantha is a species of moth of the family Tortricidae first described by Edward Meyrick in 1909. It is found on Seram and Java in Indonesia and in Palnis and Khasis in southern India. The habitat consists of bamboo and secondary forests.
