= Semniotes =

Scientific classification
- Kingdom: Animalia
- Phylum: Arthropoda
- Class: Insecta
- Order: Lepidoptera
- Family: Tortricidae
- Subfamily: Olethreutinae
- Tribe: Olethreutini
- Genus: Semniotes; Diakonoff, 1973

Genus of tortrix moths

Semniotes is a genus of moths belonging to the subfamily Olethreutinae of the family Tortricidae.

== Species ==
- Semniotes abrupta Diakonoff, 1973
- Semniotes bellana Kuznetzov, 1988
- Semniotes confinana Kuznetzov, 2003
- Semniotes halantha (Meyrick, 1909)
