= Phaulacantha metamelas =

Scientific classification
- Domain: Eukaryota
- Kingdom: Animalia
- Phylum: Arthropoda
- Class: Insecta
- Order: Lepidoptera
- Family: Tortricidae
- Genus: Phaulacantha
- Species: P. metamelas

Binomial name
- Phaulacantha metamelas Diakonoff, 1973

Species of moth

Phaulacantha metamelas is a moth of the family Tortricidae. It is found in Thailand and eastern Borneo.

The wingspan is 14 mm.
