= Phaulacantha =

Scientific classification
- Domain: Eukaryota
- Kingdom: Animalia
- Phylum: Arthropoda
- Class: Insecta
- Order: Lepidoptera
- Family: Tortricidae
- Tribe: Olethreutini
- Genus: Phaulacantha; Diakonoff, 1973

Genus of tortrix moths

Phaulacantha is a genus of moths belonging to the subfamily Olethreutinae of the family Tortricidae.

== Species ==
- Phaulacantha acyclica Diakonoff, 1973
- Phaulacantha catharostoma (Meyrick, 1921)
- Phaulacantha metamelas Diakonoff, 1973

== See also ==
- List of Tortricidae genera
