= Taiteccopsis davisorum =

Scientific classification
- Kingdom: Animalia
- Phylum: Arthropoda
- Class: Insecta
- Order: Lepidoptera
- Family: Tortricidae
- Genus: Taiteccopsis
- Species: T. davisorum

Binomial name
- Taiteccopsis davisorum Razowski, 2013

Species of moth

Taiteccopsis davisorum is a species of moth of the family Tortricidae. It is found in Nigeria.

The wingspan is about 9.5 mm.

== Etymology ==
The species is named for Don and Mignon Davis who collected the species.
