= Taiteccopsis =

Scientific classification
- Kingdom: Animalia
- Phylum: Arthropoda
- Class: Insecta
- Order: Lepidoptera
- Family: Tortricidae
- Tribe: Olethreutini
- Genus: Taiteccopsis; Razowski, 2012

Synonyms
- Teiteccopsis Razowski, 2013

Genus of moths

Taiteccopsis is a genus of moths belonging to the subfamily Olethreutinae of the family Tortricidae.

== Species ==
- Taiteccopsis davisorum Razowski, 2013
- Taiteccopsis taitana Razowski, 2012

== See also ==
- List of Tortricidae genera
