= Nenomoshia poetica =

Scientific classification
- Kingdom: Animalia
- Phylum: Arthropoda
- Class: Insecta
- Order: Lepidoptera
- Family: Tortricidae
- Genus: Nenomoshia
- Species: N. poetica

Binomial name
- Nenomoshia poetica (Meyrick, 1909)

Synonyms
- Argyroploce poetica Meyrick, 1909; Olethreutes poetica Clarke, 1958; Eucosma mosaica Meyrick, 1907; Nenomoshia poetica Clarke, 1976

Species of moth

Nenomoshia poetica is a moth of the family Tortricidae first described by Edward Meyrick in 1909. It is found in India, Sri Lanka, the Mariana Islands and Australia.
