= Semutophila =

Scientific classification
- Domain: Eukaryota
- Kingdom: Animalia
- Phylum: Arthropoda
- Class: Insecta
- Order: Lepidoptera
- Family: Tortricidae
- Tribe: Olethreutini
- Genus: Semutophila; Tuck, 1986

Genus of tortrix moths

Semutophila is a genus of moths belonging to the subfamily Olethreutinae of the family Tortricidae.

== Species ==
- Semutophila saccharopa Tuck, in Maschwitz, Dumpert & Tuck, 1986
- Semutophila susurra Tuck, in Maschwitz, Dumpert & Tuck, 1986

== See also ==
- List of Tortricidae genera
