= Semutophila saccharopa =

Scientific classification
- Kingdom: Animalia
- Phylum: Arthropoda
- Class: Insecta
- Order: Lepidoptera
- Family: Tortricidae
- Genus: Semutophila
- Species: S. saccharopa

Binomial name
- Semutophila saccharopa Tuck, 1986

Species of moth

Semutophila saccharopa is a moth of the family Tortricidae. It is found in Thailand and Malaysia.
