= Eppihus hippeus =

Scientific classification
- Domain: Eukaryota
- Kingdom: Animalia
- Phylum: Arthropoda
- Class: Insecta
- Order: Lepidoptera
- Family: Tortricidae
- Genus: Eppihus
- Species: E. hippeus

Binomial name
- Eppihus hippeus Razowski, 2006

Species of moth

Eppihus hippeus is a species of moth of the family Tortricidae. It is found in India (Jammu and Kashmir).

The wingspan is about 9 millimetres (0.35 in).
