= Eppihus =

Scientific classification
- Domain: Eukaryota
- Kingdom: Animalia
- Phylum: Arthropoda
- Class: Insecta
- Order: Lepidoptera
- Family: Tortricidae
- Tribe: Olethreutini
- Genus: Eppihus; Razowski, 2006

Genus of tortrix moths

Eppihus is a genus of moths of the family Tortricidae.

== Species ==
- Eppihus hippeus Razowski, 2006

== Etymology ==
The genus name is an anagram of the name of type-species of this genus.

== See also ==
- List of Tortricidae genera
