= Prophaecasia anthion =

Scientific classification
- Kingdom: Animalia
- Phylum: Arthropoda
- Class: Insecta
- Order: Lepidoptera
- Family: Tortricidae
- Genus: Prophaecasia
- Species: P. anthion

Binomial name
- Prophaecasia anthion Diakonoff, 1973

Species of moth

Prophaecasia anthion is a moth of the family Tortricidae first described by Alexey Diakonoff in 1973. It is found in Sri Lanka and Borneo.
