= Antaeola antaea =

Scientific classification
- Kingdom: Animalia
- Phylum: Arthropoda
- Class: Insecta
- Order: Lepidoptera
- Family: Tortricidae
- Genus: Antaeola
- Species: A. antaea

Binomial name
- Antaeola antaea (Meyrick, 1912)

Synonyms
- Argyroploce antaea Meyrick, 1912

Species of moth

Antaeola antaea is a moth of the family Tortricidae first described by Edward Meyrick in 1912. It is found in Sri Lanka.
