= Antaeola =

Scientific classification
- Kingdom: Animalia
- Phylum: Arthropoda
- Class: Insecta
- Order: Lepidoptera
- Family: Tortricidae
- Subfamily: Olethreutinae
- Genus: Antaeola; Diakonoff, 1973

Genus of tortrix moths

Antaeola is a genus of moths belonging to the subfamily Olethreutinae of the family Tortricidae, with a single species found in Sri Lanka.

== Species ==
- Antaeola antaea (Meyrick, 1912)

== See also ==
- List of Tortricidae genera
