= Cyclacanthina monosema =

Scientific classification
- Kingdom: Animalia
- Phylum: Arthropoda
- Class: Insecta
- Order: Lepidoptera
- Family: Tortricidae
- Genus: Cyclacanthina
- Species: C. monosema

Binomial name
- Cyclacanthina monosema Diakonoff, 1972

Species of moth

Cyclacanthina monosema is a moth of the family Tortricidae first described by Alexey Diakonoff in 1972. It is found in Sri Lanka.
