= Acleris tungurahuae =

Scientific classification
- Domain: Eukaryota
- Kingdom: Animalia
- Phylum: Arthropoda
- Class: Insecta
- Order: Lepidoptera
- Family: Tortricidae
- Genus: Acleris
- Species: A. tungurahuae

Binomial name
- Acleris tungurahuae Razowski & Wojtusiak, 2009

Species of moth

Acleris tungurahuae is a species of moth belonging to the family Tortricidae. It is found in Ecuador.

The wingspan is about 20 mm. It is distinct from all other New World Acleris species, although rather comparable with Acleris emera and Acleris matthewsi.
