= Acleris diaphora =

Scientific classification
- Kingdom: Animalia
- Phylum: Arthropoda
- Class: Insecta
- Order: Lepidoptera
- Family: Tortricidae
- Genus: Acleris
- Species: A. diaphora

Binomial name
- Acleris diaphora Razowski, 2003

Species of moth

Acleris diaphora is a species of moth of the family Tortricidae. It is found in Vietnam.
