= Acleris sinuopterana =

Scientific classification
- Domain: Eukaryota
- Kingdom: Animalia
- Phylum: Arthropoda
- Class: Insecta
- Order: Lepidoptera
- Family: Tortricidae
- Genus: Acleris
- Species: A. sinuopterana

Binomial name
- Acleris sinuopterana Liu & Bai, 1993

Species of moth

Acleris sinuopterana is a species of moth of the family Tortricidae. It is found in China (Xizang).

The wingspan is 17.2–20.9 mm. Adults have been recorded on wing in July.
