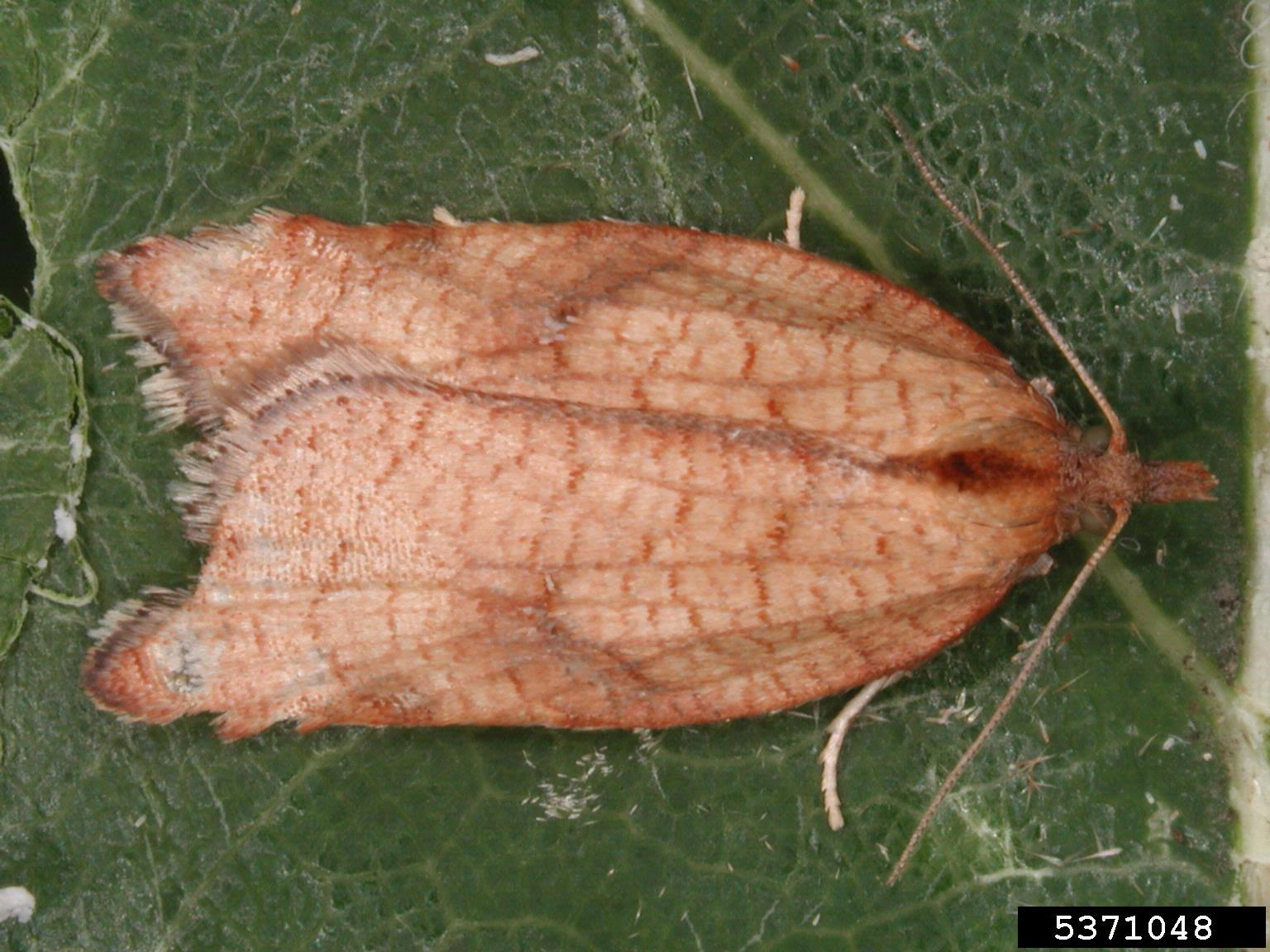
- Acleris rhombana

Scientific classification
- Kingdom: Animalia
- Phylum: Arthropoda
- Class: Insecta
- Order: Lepidoptera
- Family: Tortricidae
- Tribe: Tortricini
- Genus: Acleris; Hübner, [1825]

Synonyms
- Acteris Diakonoff, 1939; Alceris Fernald, 1903; Argrotoxa Pierce & Metcalfe, 1922; Argyrotosa Curtis, 1835; Argyrotoxa Agassiz, 1848; Argyrotoza Stephens, 1829; Cheimatophila Stephens, 1829; Cheimatophila Stephens, 1829; Cheimatophila Stephens, 1834; Chimatophila Agassiz, 1848; Chroesia Swatschek, 1958; Croeesia Fernald, 1908; Croeses Diakonoff, 1960; Croesia Hübner, [1825] 1816; Eclectis Hübner, [1825] 1816; Ergasia Issiki & Stringer, 1932; Feronea Benander, 1934; Glyphiptera Duponchel, 1834; Glyphisia Stephens, 1829; Glyphisia Stephens, 1829; Leptogramma Stephens, 1829; Lopas Hübner, [1825] 1816; Oxigrapha Hübner, [1825] 1816; Oxygrapha Agassiz, 1848; Peronaea Sherborn, 1929; Peronea Curtis, 1824; Peronea Curtis, 1834; Phloeophila Duponchel, 1834; Phloiophila Duponchel, 1834; Phylacophora Filipjev, 1931; Rhacodia Hübner, [1825] 1816; Rhocodia Hübner, [1825] 1816; Teleia Hübner, [1825] 1816; Teras Treitschke, 1829

= Acleris =

Genus of tortrix moths

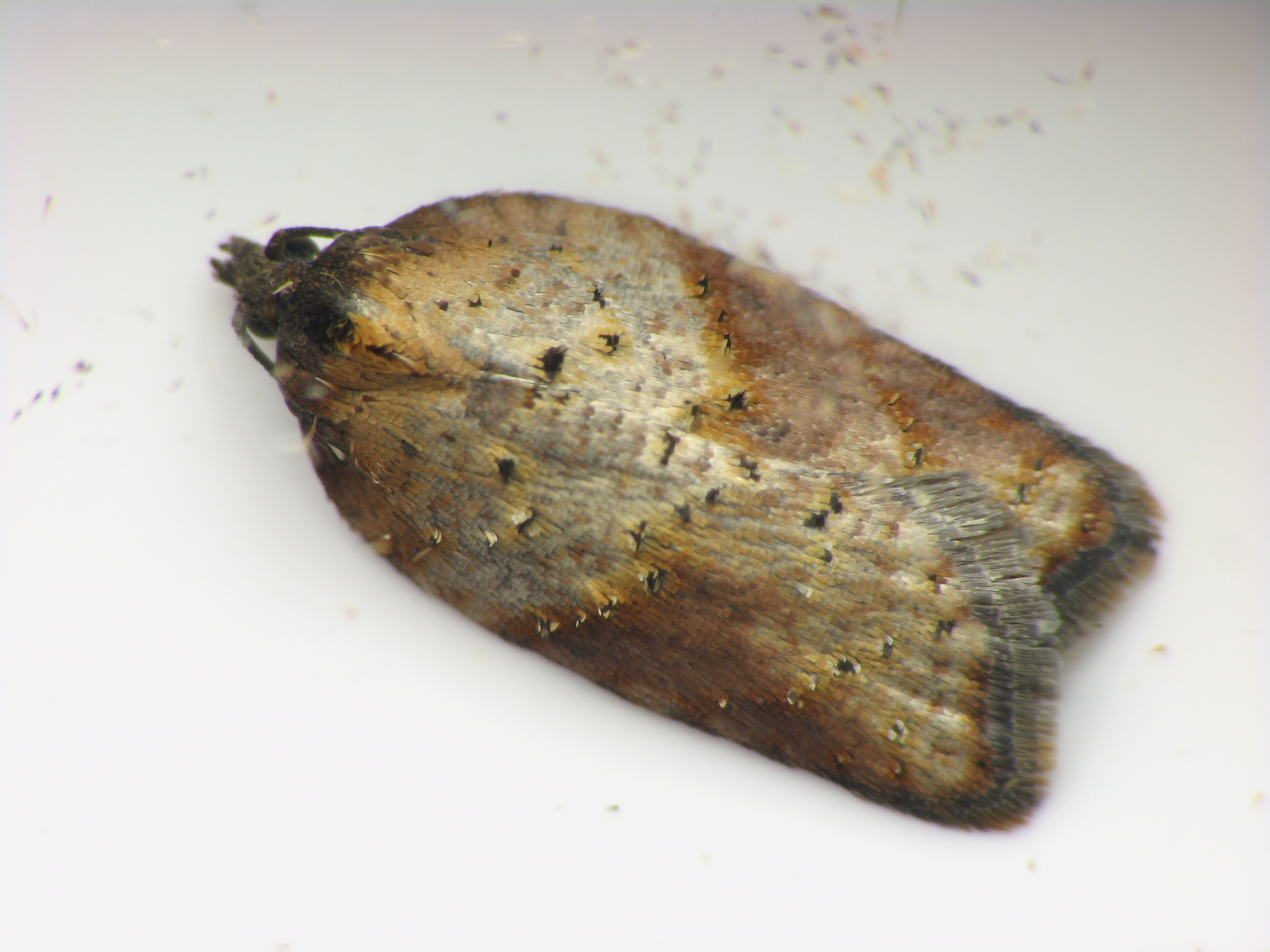
A.viburnana - viburnum acleris moth, raised on Viburnum.

Acleris is a genus of moths belonging to the subfamily Tortricinae of the family Tortricidae. As of 2007, about 241 species were known.

== Species ==
- Acleris abietana (Hübner, [1819-1822])
- Acleris aenigmana Powell, 1964
- Acleris aestuosa Yasuda, 1965
- Acleris affinatana (Snellen, 1883)
- Acleris albicomana (Clemens, 1865) – red-edged acleris moth
- Acleris albiscapulana (Christoph, 1881)
- Acleris albopterana Liu & Bai, 1993
- Acleris alnivora Oku, 1956
- Acleris amurensis (Caradja, 1928)
- Acleris arcticana (Guenee, 1845)
- Acleris arcuata (Yasuda, 1975)
- Acleris argyrograpta Razowski, 2003
- Acleris askoldana (Christoph, 1881)
- Acleris aspersana (Hübner, [1814-1817])
- Acleris atayalicana Kawabe, 1989
- Acleris atomophora Diakonoff, 1976
- Acleris auricaput Razowski, 1971
- Acleris aurichalcana (Bremer, 1865)
- Acleris avicularia Razowski, 1964
- Acleris bacurana (Turati, 1934)
- Acleris baleina Razowski & Trematerra, 2010
- Acleris bengalica Razowski, 1964
- Acleris bergmanniana (Linnaeus, 1758) – yellow rose button moth
- Acleris bicolor Kawabe, 1963
- Acleris blanda (Yasuda, 1975)
- Acleris boscana (Fabricius, 1794)
- Acleris boscanoides Razowski, 1959
- Acleris bowmanana (McDunnough, 1934)
- Acleris braunana (McDunnough, 1934)
- Acleris britannia Kearfott, 1904 – Brittania moth
- Acleris bununa Kawabe, 1989
- Acleris busckana (McDunnough, 1934)
- Acleris caerulescens (Walsingham, 1900)
- Acleris caledoniana (Stephens, 1852)
- Acleris caliginosana (Walker, 1863)
- Acleris cameroonana Razowski, 2012
- Acleris capizziana Obraztsov, 1963
- Acleris caucasica (Filipjev, 1962)
- Acleris celiana (Robinson, 1869)
- Acleris cervinana (Fernald, 1882)
- Acleris chalybeana (Fernald, 1882) – lesser maple leafroller moth
- Acleris chionocentra (Meyrick, 1908)
- Acleris chloroma Razowski, 1993
- Acleris clarkei Obraztsov, 1963
- Acleris comandrana (Fernald, 1892)
- Acleris comariana (Lienig & Zeller, 1846) – strawberry tortrix moth
- Acleris compsoptila (Meyrick, 1923)
- Acleris conchyloides (Walsingham, 1900)
- Acleris coniferarum (Filipjev, 1962)
- Acleris cornana (McDunnough, 1933)
- Acleris crassa Razowski & Yasuda, 1964
- Acleris crataegi (Kuznetzov, 1964)
- Acleris cribellata Falkovitsh, 1965
- Acleris cristana ([Denis & Schiffermüller], 1775) – rufous-margined button moth
- Acleris curvalana (Kearfott, 1907) – blueberry leaftier moth
- Acleris dealbata (Yasuda, 1975)
- Acleris decolorata Razowski, 1964
- Acleris delicata (Yasuda & Kawabe, 1980)
- Acleris delicatana (Christoph, 1881)
- Acleris dentata (Razowski, 1966)
- Acleris denticulosa Diakonoff, 1976
- Acleris diadecta Razowski, 2003
- Acleris diaphora Razowski, 2003
- Acleris dispar (Liu & Bai, 1987)
- Acleris dryochyta (Meyrick in Caradja & Meyrick, 1937)
- Acleris duoloba Razowski, 2003
- Acleris duracina Razowski, 1974
- Acleris effractana (Hübner, 1799) – hook-winged tortrix moth
- Acleris elaearcha (Meyrick, 1908)
- Acleris elegans Oku, 1956
- Acleris emargana (Fabricius, 1775) – notched-winged tortrix moth
- Acleris emera Razowski, 1993
- Acleris enitescens (Meyrick, 1912)
- Acleris expressa (Filipjev, 1931)
- Acleris exsucana (Kennel, 1901)
- Acleris extensana (Walker, 1863)
- Acleris extranea Razowski, 1975
- Acleris ferox (Razowski, 1975)
- Acleris ferrugana ([Denis & Schiffermüller], 1775)
- Acleris filipjevi Obraztsov, 1956
- Acleris fimbriana (Thunberg & Becklin, 1791) – yellow tortrix moth
- Acleris fistularis Diakonoff, 1976
- Acleris flavivittana (Clemens, 1864) – multiform leafroller moth
- Acleris flavopterana Liu & Bai, 1993
- Acleris foliana (Walsingham, 1879)
- Acleris forbesana (McDunnough, 1934) – Forbes' acleris moth
- Acleris formosae Razowski, 1964
- Acleris forsskaleana (Linnaeus, 1758) – maple leaftier moth
- Acleris fragariana Kearfott, 1904
- Acleris fuscana – small aspen leaftier moth
- Acleris fuscopterana Liu & Bai, 1993
- Acleris fuscopunctata (Liu & Bai, 1987)
- Acleris fuscotogata (Walsingham, 1900)
- Acleris ganeshia Razowski, 2012
- Acleris gatesclarkei Kawabe, 1992
- Acleris gibbopterana Liu & Bai, 1993
- Acleris glaucomis (Meyrick, 1908)
- Acleris gloverana (Walsingham, 1879) – western black-headed budworm moth
- Acleris gobica Kuznetzov, 1975
- Acleris gothena Razowski, 2012
- Acleris griseopterana Liu & Bai, 1993
- Acleris hapalactis (Meyrick, 1912)
- Acleris harenna Razowski & Trematerra, 2010
- Acleris hastiana (Linnaeus, 1758)
- Acleris helvolaris (Liu & Bai, 1987)
- Acleris hippophaeana (Heyden, 1865)
- Acleris hispidana (Christoph, 1881)
- Acleris hohuanshana Kawabe, 1989
- Acleris hokkaidana Razowski & Yasuda, 1964
- Acleris holmiana (Linnaeus, 1758) – golden leafroller moth
- Acleris hudsoniana (Walker, 1863)
- Acleris hyemana (Haworth, [1811])
- Acleris idonea Razowski, 1972
- Acleris imitatrix (Razowski, 1975)
- Acleris implexana (Walker, 1863)
- Acleris inana (Robinson, 1869)
- Acleris incognita Obraztsov, 1963
- Acleris indignana (Christoph, 1881)
- Acleris issikii Oku, 1957
- Acleris japonica (Walsingham, 1900)
- Acleris kearfottana (McDunnough, 1934)
- Acleris keiferi Powell, 1964
- Acleris kerincina Razowski, 2012
- Acleris kinangopana Razowski, 1964
- Acleris klotsi Obraztsov, 1963
- Acleris kochiella (Goeze, 1783)
- Acleris kodamai Yasuda, 1965
- Acleris kuznetzovi Razowski, 1989
- Acleris lacordairana (Duponchel, in Godart, 1836)
- Acleris laterana (Fabricius, 1794)
- Acleris leechi (Walsingham, 1900)
- Acleris leucophracta (Meyrick, 1937)
- Acleris lipsiana ([Denis & Schiffermüller], 1775)
- Acleris literana (Linnaeus, 1758) – sprinkled rough-wing moth
- Acleris logiana (Clerck, 1759) – black-headed birch leaffolder moth
- Acleris longipalpana (Snellen, 1883)
- Acleris lorquiniana (Duponchel, in Godart, 1835)
- Acleris loxoscia (Meyrick, 1907)
- Acleris lucipara Razowski, 1964
- Acleris lucipeta Razowski, 1966
- Acleris luoyingensis Kawabe, 1992
- Acleris lutescentis (Liu & Bai, 1987)
- Acleris maccana (Treitschke, 1835) – marbled dog’s-tooth tortrix
- Acleris macdunnoughi Obraztsov, 1963
- Acleris macropterana Liu & Bai, 1993
- Acleris maculidorsana (Clemens, 1864) – stained-back leafroller moth
- Acleris maculopterana Liu & Bai, 1993
- Acleris malagassana Diakonoff, 1973
- Acleris matthewsi Razowski, 1986
- Acleris maximana (Barnes & Busck, 1920)
- Acleris medea Diakonoff, 1976
- Acleris micropterana Liu & Bai, 1993
- Acleris minuta (Robinson, 1869) – yellow-headed fireworm moth
- Acleris monagma Diakonoff, 1976
- Acleris mundana Kuznetzov, 1979
- Acleris nakajimai Kawabe, 1992
- Acleris napaea (Meyrick, 1912)
- Acleris nectaritis (Meyrick, 1912)
- Acleris negundana (Busck, 1940) – speckled acleris moth
- Acleris nigrilineana Kawabe, 1963
- Acleris nigriradix (Filipjev, 1931)
- Acleris nigrolinea (Robinson, 1869)
- Acleris nigropterana Liu & Bai, 1993
- Acleris nishidai J.W.Brown, 2008
- Acleris nivisellana (Walsingham, 1879) – snowy-shouldered acleris moth
- Acleris notana (Donovan, [1806])
- Acleris obligatoria Park & Razowski, 1991
- Acleris obtusana (Eversmann, 1844)
- Acleris ochropicta Razowski, 1975
- Acleris ochropterana Liu & Bai, 1993
- Acleris okanagana (McDunnough, 1940)
- Acleris ophthalmicana Razowski & Yasuda, 1964
- Acleris orphnocycla (Meyrick in Caradja & Meyrick, 1937)
- Acleris osthelderi (Obraztsov, 1949)
- Acleris oxycoccana (Packard, 1869)
- Acleris pallidorbis Diakonoff, 1976
- Acleris paracinderella Powell, 1964
- Acleris paradiseana (Walsingham, 1900)
- Acleris perfundana Kuznetzov, 1962
- Acleris permutana (Duponchel, in Godart, 1836)
- Acleris phalera (Kuznetzov, 1964)
- Acleris phanerocrypta Diakonoff, 1973
- Acleris phantastica Razowski & Yasuda, 1964
- Acleris phyllosocia Razowski, 2008
- Acleris placata (Meyrick, 1912)
- Acleris placidus Yasuda & Kawabe, 1980
- Acleris platynotana (Walsingham, 1900)
- Acleris porphyrocentra (Meyrick in Caradja & Meyrick, 1937)
- Acleris potosiana Razowski & Becker, 2003
- Acleris praeterita Park & Razowski, 1991
- Acleris proximana (Caradja, 1927)
- Acleris ptychogrammos (Zeller, 1875)
- Acleris pulchella Kawabe, 1963
- Acleris pulcherrima Razowski, 1971
- Acleris quadridentana (Walsingham, 1900)
- Acleris quercinana (Zeller, 1849)
- Acleris rantaizana Razowski, 1966
- Acleris razowskii (Yasuda, 1975)
- Acleris recula Razowski, 1974
- Acleris retrusa Razowski, 1993
- Acleris rhombana ([Denis & Schiffermüller], 1775) – rhomboid tortrix moth
- Acleris robinsoniana (Forbes, 1923) – Robinson's acleris moth
- Acleris roscidana (Hübner, [1796-1799])
- Acleris rosella (Liu & Bai, 1987)
- Acleris roxana Razowski & Yasuda, 1964
- Acleris rubi Razowski, 2005
- Acleris rubivorella (Filipjev, 1962)
- Acleris rufana ([Denis & Schiffermüller], 1775)
- Acleris ruwenzorica Razowski, 2005
- Acleris sagmatias (Meyrick, 1905)
- Acleris salicicola Kuznetzov, 1970
- Acleris santacrucis Obraztsov, 1963
- Acleris scabrana ([Denis & Schiffermüller], 1775) – gray rough-wing moth
- Acleris schalleriana (Linnaeus, 1761) – Schaller's acleris moth
- Acleris schiasma Razowski, 2012
- Acleris semiannula (Robinson, 1869)
- Acleris semipurpurana (Kearfott, 1905) – oak leaftier moth
- Acleris semitexta (Meyrick, 1912)
- Acleris senescens (Zeller, 1874)
- Acleris shepherdana (Stephens, 1852)
- Acleris similis (Filipjev, 1931)
- Acleris simpliciana (Walsingham, 1879)
- Acleris sinica (Razowski, 1966)
- Acleris sinuopterana Liu & Bai, 1993
- Acleris sinuosaria Razowski, 1964
- Acleris sordidata Razowski, 1971
- Acleris sparsana ([Denis & Schiffermüller], 1775)
- Acleris stachi (Razowski, 1953)
- Acleris stadiana (Barnes & Busck, 1920)
- Acleris stibiana (Snellen, 1883)
- Acleris strigifera (Filipjev, 1931)
- Acleris submaccana (Filipjev, 1962)
- Acleris subnivana (Walker, 1863)
- Acleris supernova Razowski & Wojtusiak, 2009
- Acleris tabida Razowski, 1975
- Acleris taiwana Kawabe, 1992
- Acleris takeuchii Razowski & Yasuda, 1964
- Acleris thiana Razowski, 1966
- Acleris thomasi Razowski, 1990
- Acleris thylacitis (Meyrick, 1920)
- Acleris tibetica Razowski, 1964
- Acleris tigricolor (Walsingham, 1900)
- Acleris tremewani Razowski, 1964
- Acleris trujilloana Razowski & Wojtusiak, 2013
- Acleris tsuifengana Kawabe, 1992
- Acleris tungurahuae Razowski & Wojtusiak, 2009
- Acleris tunicatana (Walsingham, 1900)
- Acleris ulmicola (Meyrick, 1930)
- Acleris umbrana (Hübner, [1796-1799])
- Acleris undulana (Walsingham, 1900) – cedar leaf moth
- Acleris uniformis (Filipjev, 1931)
- Acleris variana (Fernald, in Packard, 1886) – eastern black-headed budworm moth
- Acleris variegana ([Denis & Schiffermüller], 1775) – garden rose tortrix moth, fruit tortrix moth
- Acleris venatana Kawabe, 1992
- Acleris yasudai Razowski, 1966
- Acleris yasutoshii Kawabe, 1985
- Acleris youngana (McDunnough, 1934)
- Acleris zeta Razowski, 1964
- Acleris zimmermani Clarke in Zimmerman, 1978

== Former species ==
- Acleris ferrumixtana (Benander, 1934)
- Acleris placidana (Robinson, 1869)

== See also ==
- List of Tortricidae genera
