= Acleris arcuata =

Scientific classification
- Kingdom: Animalia
- Phylum: Arthropoda
- Clade: Pancrustacea
- Class: Insecta
- Order: Lepidoptera
- Family: Tortricidae
- Genus: Acleris
- Species: A. arcuata

Binomial name
- Acleris arcuata (Yasuda, 1975)

Synonyms
- Croesia arcuata Yasuda, 1975

Species of moth

Acleris arcuata is a species of moth of the family Tortricidae. It is found in Japan (Honshu).

The wingspan is 14–17 mm.
