= Acleris strigifera =

Scientific classification
- Domain: Eukaryota
- Kingdom: Animalia
- Phylum: Arthropoda
- Class: Insecta
- Order: Lepidoptera
- Family: Tortricidae
- Genus: Acleris
- Species: A. strigifera

Binomial name
- Acleris strigifera (Filipjev, 1931)

Synonyms
- Peronea strigifera Filipjev, 1931

Species of moth

Acleris strigifera is a species of moth of the family Tortricidae. It is found in China, Japan and Russia.

The wingspan is 19–22 mm. Adults are on wing from September, and after overwintering, to May.
