= Acleris fuscopunctata =

Scientific classification
- Domain: Eukaryota
- Kingdom: Animalia
- Phylum: Arthropoda
- Class: Insecta
- Order: Lepidoptera
- Family: Tortricidae
- Genus: Acleris
- Species: A. fuscopunctata

Binomial name
- Acleris fuscopunctata (Liu & Bai, 1987)

Synonyms
- Croesia fuscopunctata Liu & Bai, 1987

Species of moth

Acleris fuscopunctata is a species of moth of the family Tortricidae. It is found in China (Fujien).
