= Acleris micropterana =

Scientific classification
- Domain: Eukaryota
- Kingdom: Animalia
- Phylum: Arthropoda
- Class: Insecta
- Order: Lepidoptera
- Family: Tortricidae
- Genus: Acleris
- Species: A. micropterana

Binomial name
- Acleris micropterana Liu & Bai, 1993

Species of moth

Acleris micropterana is a species of moth of the family Tortricidae. It is found in China (Beijing, Heilongjiang).

The wingspan is 9.6–15.4 mm. Adults have been recorded on wing in July and August.
