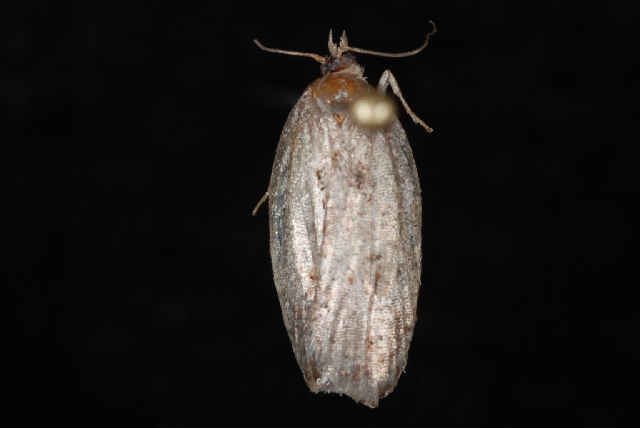

Scientific classification
- Kingdom: Animalia
- Phylum: Arthropoda
- Clade: Pancrustacea
- Class: Insecta
- Order: Lepidoptera
- Family: Tortricidae
- Genus: Acleris
- Species: A. robinsoniana

Binomial name
- Acleris robinsoniana (Forbes, 1923)

Synonyms
- Peronea robinsoniana Forbes, 1923; Peronea clemensiana Forbes, 1923

= Acleris robinsoniana =

Robinson's acleris moth

Species of moth

Acleris robinsoniana, Robinson's acleris moth, is a species of moth of the family Tortricidae. It is found in North America, where it has been recorded from the north-eastern United States across southern Canada to British Columbia and south to California.

The length of the forewings is 8.1–8.7 mm. There are up to two generations per year with adults on wing from May to June.

The larvae feed on Rosa californica.
