= Acleris extranea =

Scientific classification
- Kingdom: Animalia
- Phylum: Arthropoda
- Class: Insecta
- Order: Lepidoptera
- Family: Tortricidae
- Genus: Acleris
- Species: A. extranea

Binomial name
- Acleris extranea Razowski, 1975

Species of moth

Acleris extranea is a species of moth of the family Tortricidae. It is found in China (Yunnan).
