= Acleris comandrana =

Scientific classification
- Domain: Eukaryota
- Kingdom: Animalia
- Phylum: Arthropoda
- Class: Insecta
- Order: Lepidoptera
- Family: Tortricidae
- Genus: Acleris
- Species: A. comandrana

Binomial name
- Acleris comandrana (Fernald, 1892)

Synonyms
- Teras comandrana Fernald, 1892

Species of moth

Acleris comandrana is a species of moth of the family Tortricidae. It is found in North America, where it has been recorded from Maine, Maryland, Massachusetts and New Mexico.

The wingspan is about 12 mm. Adults have been recorded on wing from April to August and from October to November.

The larvae feed on Comandra species.
