= Acleris praeterita =

Scientific classification
- Kingdom: Animalia
- Phylum: Arthropoda
- Class: Insecta
- Order: Lepidoptera
- Family: Tortricidae
- Genus: Acleris
- Species: A. praeterita

Binomial name
- Acleris praeterita Park & Razowski, 1991

Synonyms
- Acleris praerita Park & Razowski, 1991

Species of moth

Acleris praeterita is a species of moth of the family Tortricidae. It is found in South Korea.
