= Acleris rubivorella =

Scientific classification
- Domain: Eukaryota
- Kingdom: Animalia
- Phylum: Arthropoda
- Class: Insecta
- Order: Lepidoptera
- Family: Tortricidae
- Genus: Acleris
- Species: A. rubivorella

Binomial name
- Acleris rubivorella ([Filipjev, 1962)

Synonyms
- Peronea rubivorella Filipjev, 1962

Species of moth

Acleris rubivorella is a species of moth of the family Tortricidae. It is found in southern European Russia and Kazakhstan.

The larvae feed on Betula, Malus, Spiraea, Polygonum and Rubus species.
