= Acleris idonea =

Scientific classification
- Kingdom: Animalia
- Phylum: Arthropoda
- Class: Insecta
- Order: Lepidoptera
- Family: Tortricidae
- Genus: Acleris
- Species: A. idonea

Binomial name
- Acleris idonea Razowski, 1972

Species of moth

Acleris idonea is a species of moth of the family Tortricidae. It is found in Mongolia.
