= Acleris crataegi =

Scientific classification
- Domain: Eukaryota
- Kingdom: Animalia
- Phylum: Arthropoda
- Class: Insecta
- Order: Lepidoptera
- Family: Tortricidae
- Genus: Acleris
- Species: A. crataegi

Binomial name
- Acleris crataegi (Kuznetzov, 1964)

Synonyms
- Ergasia crataegi Kuznetzov, 1964; Croesia crataegi

Species of moth

Acleris crataegi is a species of moth of the family Tortricidae. It is found in South Korea, China (Hunan, Heilongjiang), Japan and Russia (Amur).

The wingspan is about 15 mm.

The larvae feed on Crataegus pinnatifida.
