= Acleris retrusa =

Scientific classification
- Kingdom: Animalia
- Phylum: Arthropoda
- Class: Insecta
- Order: Lepidoptera
- Family: Tortricidae
- Genus: Acleris
- Species: A. retrusa

Binomial name
- Acleris retrusa Razowski, 1993

Species of moth

Acleris retrusa is a species of moth of the family Tortricidae. It is found in Mexico (Veracruz, Jalapa).

The wingspan is about 16 mm.

The larvae feed on Rubus species.
