= Acleris kinangopana =

Scientific classification
- Domain: Eukaryota
- Kingdom: Animalia
- Phylum: Arthropoda
- Class: Insecta
- Order: Lepidoptera
- Family: Tortricidae
- Genus: Acleris
- Species: A. kinangopana

Binomial name
- Acleris kinangopana Razowski, 1964

Species of moth

Acleris kinangopana is a species of moth of the family Tortricidae. It is found in Kenya.
