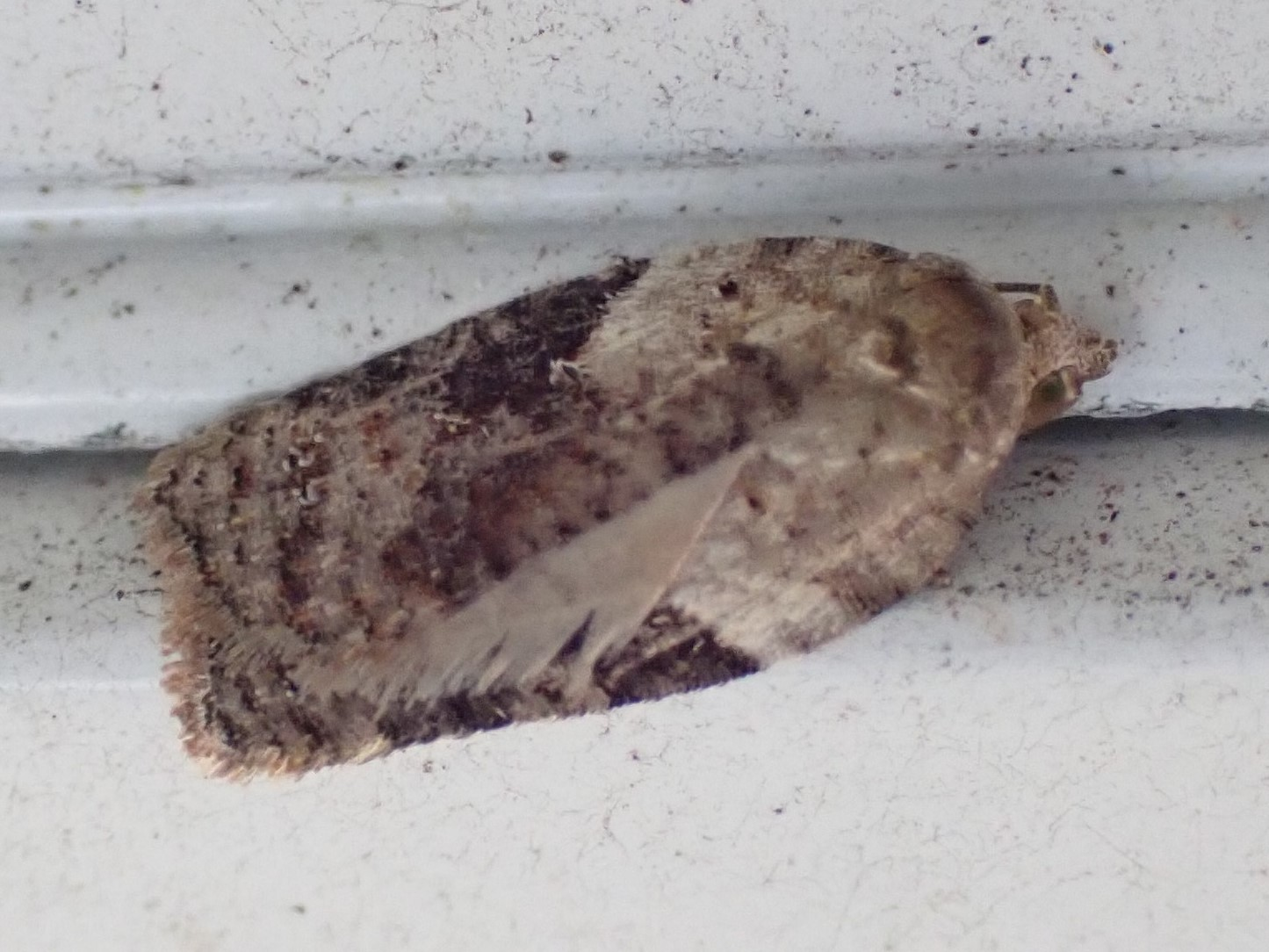

Scientific classification
- Domain: Eukaryota
- Kingdom: Animalia
- Phylum: Arthropoda
- Class: Insecta
- Order: Lepidoptera
- Family: Tortricidae
- Genus: Acleris
- Species: A. forbesana

Binomial name
- Acleris forbesana (McDunnough, 1934)

Synonyms
- Peronea forbesana McDunnough, 1934

= Acleris forbesana =

Forbes' acleris moth

Species of moth

Acleris forbesana, the Forbes' acleris moth, is a species of moth of the family Tortricidae. It is found in North America, where it has been recorded from Alberta, British Columbia, California, Illinois, Indiana, Maine, Massachusetts, Michigan, Minnesota, New Brunswick, North Carolina, Ontario, Quebec, Tennessee and Wisconsin.

The wingspan is 13–16 mm. Adults have been recorded on wing from March to April and again from June to October in two or more generations per year.

The larvae feed on Cornus species (including Cornus californica and Cornus sericea).
