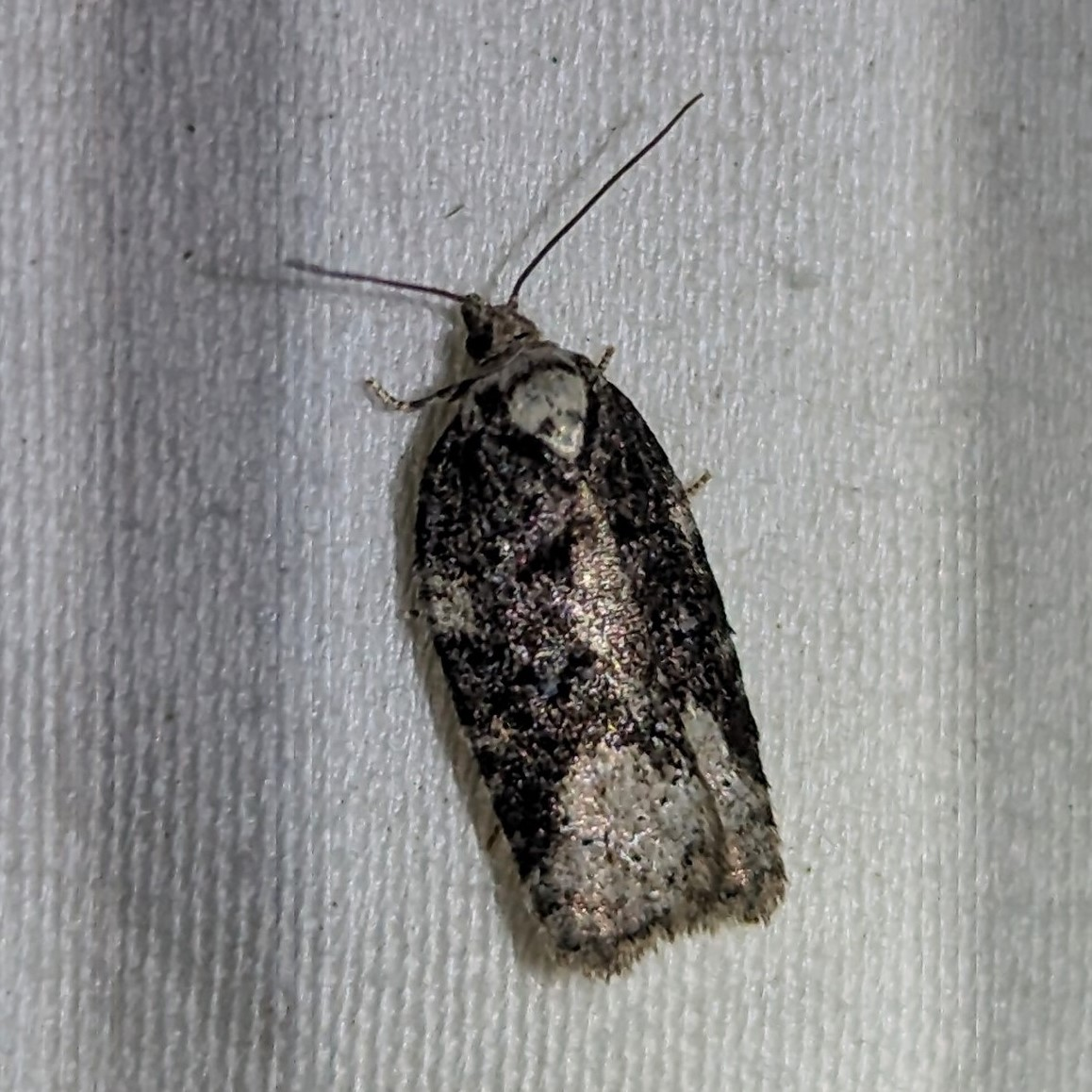

Scientific classification
- Kingdom: Animalia
- Phylum: Arthropoda
- Class: Insecta
- Order: Lepidoptera
- Family: Tortricidae
- Genus: Acleris
- Species: A. clarkei

Binomial name
- Acleris clarkei Obraztsov, 1963

= Acleris clarkei =

Species of moth

Acleris clarkei is a species of moth in the family Tortricidae. It is found in North America, where it has been recorded from Michigan, New Brunswick, Manitoba and Washington.

The length of the forewings is 7–8 mm. Adults have been recorded on wing in April, May, August and October.
