= Acleris roxana =

Scientific classification
- Kingdom: Animalia
- Phylum: Arthropoda
- Clade: Pancrustacea
- Class: Insecta
- Order: Lepidoptera
- Family: Tortricidae
- Genus: Acleris
- Species: A. roxana

Binomial name
- Acleris roxana Razowski & Yasuda, 1964

Species of moth

Acleris roxana is a species of moth of the family Tortricidae. It is found in Japan (Honshu).

The length of the forewings is about 6.5 mm for males and about 7.5 mm for females.
