= Acleris tsuifengana =

Scientific classification
- Kingdom: Animalia
- Phylum: Arthropoda
- Class: Insecta
- Order: Lepidoptera
- Family: Tortricidae
- Genus: Acleris
- Species: A. tsuifengana

Binomial name
- Acleris tsuifengana Kawabe, 1992

Species of moth

Acleris tsuifengana is a species of moth of the family Tortricidae. It is found in Taiwan.
