= Acleris ganeshia =

Scientific classification
- Domain: Eukaryota
- Kingdom: Animalia
- Phylum: Arthropoda
- Class: Insecta
- Order: Lepidoptera
- Family: Tortricidae
- Genus: Acleris
- Species: A. ganeshia

Binomial name
- Acleris ganeshia Razowski, 2012

Species of moth

Acleris ganeshia is a species of moth of the family Tortricidae. It is found in Nepal.

The wingspan is about 32.5 mm for males and 24 mm for females.

== Etymology ==
The species name refers to the type locality.
