= Acleris zimmermani =

Scientific classification
- Domain: Eukaryota
- Kingdom: Animalia
- Phylum: Arthropoda
- Class: Insecta
- Order: Lepidoptera
- Family: Tortricidae
- Genus: Acleris
- Species: A. zimmermani

Binomial name
- Acleris zimmermani (Clarke in Zimmerman, 1978)

Synonyms
- Croesia zimmermani Clarke in Zimmerman, 1978

Species of moth

Acleris zimmermani is a moth of the family Tortricidae described by John Frederick Gates Clarke in 1978. It is native to Mexico, but was introduced to the Hawaiian islands of Kauai, Maui and Hawaii for the control of blackberry.

The wingspan is 11–14 mm.

The larvae feed on Rubus species.
