= Acleris supernova =

Scientific classification
- Domain: Eukaryota
- Kingdom: Animalia
- Phylum: Arthropoda
- Class: Insecta
- Order: Lepidoptera
- Family: Tortricidae
- Genus: Acleris
- Species: A. supernova

Binomial name
- Acleris supernova Razowski & Wojtusiak, 2009

Synonyms
- Homona supernova

Species of moth

Acleris supernova is a species of moth belonging to the family Tortricidae. It is found in Ecuador.

The wingspan is about 17 mm.
