= Acleris quadridentana =

Scientific classification
- Domain: Eukaryota
- Kingdom: Animalia
- Phylum: Arthropoda
- Class: Insecta
- Order: Lepidoptera
- Family: Tortricidae
- Genus: Acleris
- Species: A. quadridentana

Binomial name
- Acleris quadridentana (Walsingham, 1900)

Synonyms
- Oxygrapha quadridentana Walsingham, 1900

Species of moth

Acleris quadridentana is a species of moth of the family Tortricidae. It is found in China.

The wingspan is about 20 mm. The forewings are reddish green. The hindwings are brownish grey.
