= Acleris kodamai =

Scientific classification
- Kingdom: Animalia
- Phylum: Arthropoda
- Clade: Pancrustacea
- Class: Insecta
- Order: Lepidoptera
- Family: Tortricidae
- Genus: Acleris
- Species: A. kodamai

Binomial name
- Acleris kodamai Yasuda, 1965

Species of moth

Acleris kodamai is a species of moth of the family Tortricidae. It is found in South Korea, China and Japan.

The wingspan is about 24 mm. There is one generation per year with adults on wing from June to July.

The larvae feed on Pinus koraiensis.
