= Acleris trujilloana =

Scientific classification
- Domain: Eukaryota
- Kingdom: Animalia
- Phylum: Arthropoda
- Class: Insecta
- Order: Lepidoptera
- Family: Tortricidae
- Genus: Acleris
- Species: A. trujilloana

Binomial name
- Acleris trujilloana Razowski & Wojtusiak, 2013

Species of moth

Acleris trujilloana is a species of moth of the family Tortricidae. It is found in Venezuela.

The wingspan is about 19 mm.

== Etymology ==
The species name refers to the state of Trujillo in Venezuela.
