= Acleris leucophracta =

Scientific classification
- Kingdom: Animalia
- Phylum: Arthropoda
- Class: Insecta
- Order: Lepidoptera
- Family: Tortricidae
- Genus: Acleris
- Species: A. leucophracta

Binomial name
- Acleris leucophracta (Meyrick in Caradja & Meyrick, 1937)

Synonyms
- Argyrotoxa leucophracta Meyrick in Caradja & Meyrick, 1937; Pseudargyrotoza leucophracta (Meyrick in Caradja & Meyrick, 1937) See Obraztov, 1965:1

Species of moth

Acleris leucophracta is a moth of the family Tortricidae. It is found in Yunnan, China. It was originally described as Argyrotoxa leucophracta Meyrick, 1937 but later recombined as Acleris leucophracta (Meyrick, 1937) due to synonymy of its former genus Argyrotoxa as Acleris.
