= Acleris gobica =

Scientific classification
- Domain: Eukaryota
- Kingdom: Animalia
- Phylum: Arthropoda
- Class: Insecta
- Order: Lepidoptera
- Family: Tortricidae
- Genus: Acleris
- Species: A. gobica

Binomial name
- Acleris gobica Kuznetzov, 1975

Species of moth

Acleris gobica is a species of moth of the family Tortricidae. It is found in Mongolia.
