= Acleris elegans =

Scientific classification
- Domain: Eukaryota
- Kingdom: Animalia
- Phylum: Arthropoda
- Class: Insecta
- Order: Lepidoptera
- Family: Tortricidae
- Genus: Acleris
- Species: A. elegans

Binomial name
- Acleris elegans Oku, 1956

Synonyms
- Croesia elegans

Species of moth

Acleris elegans is a species of moth of the family Tortricidae. It is found in Japan (Hokkaido).

The wingspan is 14–16 mm.

The larvae feed on Populus species.
