= Acleris yasudai =

Scientific classification
- Kingdom: Animalia
- Phylum: Arthropoda
- Class: Insecta
- Order: Lepidoptera
- Family: Tortricidae
- Genus: Acleris
- Species: A. yasudai

Binomial name
- Acleris yasudai Razowski, 1966

Species of moth

Acleris yasudai is a species of moth of the family Tortricidae. It is found in Japan (Honshu). The wingspan is 20–21 mm. The larvae feed on Enkianthus campanullatus and Enkianthus campanullatus var. sikokianus.
