= Acleris okanagana =

Scientific classification
- Domain: Eukaryota
- Kingdom: Animalia
- Phylum: Arthropoda
- Class: Insecta
- Order: Lepidoptera
- Family: Tortricidae
- Genus: Acleris
- Species: A. okanagana

Binomial name
- Acleris okanagana (McDunnough, 1940)

Synonyms
- Peronea okanagana McDunnough, 1940; Acleris acanagana Razowski, 1966

Species of moth

Acleris okanagana is a species of moth of the family Tortricidae. It is found in North America, where it has been recorded from British Columbia and Quebec.

The wingspan is about 17 mm. Adults have been recorded on wing in June.
