= Acleris baleina =

Scientific classification
- Kingdom: Animalia
- Phylum: Arthropoda
- Class: Insecta
- Order: Lepidoptera
- Family: Tortricidae
- Genus: Acleris
- Species: A. baleina

Binomial name
- Acleris baleina Razowski & Trematerra, 2010

Species of moth

Acleris baleina is a species of moth of the family Tortricidae. It is found in Ethiopia, where it is only known from the Bale Mountains. The wingspan is about 19 mm. It has a reddish-brown head and thorax. The forewings are reddish-brown with fine brown streaks, while the hindwings are grey.

== Taxonomy ==
Acleris baleina was described by the entomologists J. Razowski and P. Trematerra in 2010 on the basis of an adult male specimen collected from the Bale Mountains in Ethiopia. The specific epithet refers to the Harenna Forest, where the species was first collected.

It belongs to the A. hastiana species group and appears to be especially closely related to A. sordidata.

== Description ==
The wingspan is about 19 mm. The head and thorax are reddish-brown. The forewings are relatively narrow and do not widen much at the tips; the leading edge (costa) is slightly curved near the base, and the outer edge (termen) is slanted and nearly straight. The base color of the forewings is reddish-brown with fine brown streaks. The cilia along the wing edges are brownish with a rust-colored line at the base. The hindwings are grey, with lighter-colored cilia.

In the male genitalia, the terminal lobes of the tegumen are broad. The tuba analis narrows toward the tip. The socius is roughly triangular in shape. The sacculus has a sharp bend just past the middle, followed by a slight inward curve, and ends with a moderately sized spine. The aedeagus is relatively long and slender, containing a group of seven spine-like cornuti along with one long, thorn-shaped structure at the rear.

The appearance of the female is unknown.

== Distribution ==
The species is endemic to Ethiopia, where it is known only from the Harenna Forest in the Bale Mountains.
