= Acleris loxoscia =

Scientific classification
- Kingdom: Animalia
- Phylum: Arthropoda
- Class: Insecta
- Order: Lepidoptera
- Family: Tortricidae
- Genus: Acleris
- Species: A. loxoscia

Binomial name
- Acleris loxoscia (Meyrick, 1907)

Synonyms
- Oxygrapha loxoscia Meyrick, 1907

Species of moth

Acleris loxoscia is a species of moth of the family Tortricidae. It is found in Sri Lanka, India (Assam), China and Taiwan.

The wingspan is 14–16 mm. The forewings range from ochreous to ferruginous, strigulated with fuscous in lighter specimens and with purplish-leaden in darker ones. There are scattered minute black dots. The hindwings are ochreous-grey whitish, suffused with pale grey posteriorly in females. Adults have been recorded on wing in October.
