= Acleris dentata =

Scientific classification
- Kingdom: Animalia
- Phylum: Arthropoda
- Class: Insecta
- Order: Lepidoptera
- Family: Tortricidae
- Genus: Acleris
- Species: A. dentata

Binomial name
- Acleris dentata (Razowski, 1966)

Synonyms
- Croesia dentata Razowski, 1966

Species of moth

Acleris dentata is a species of moth of the family Tortricidae. It is found in Japan (Honshu).

The wingspan is 18–22 mm.

The larvae feed on Tilia japonica.
