= Acleris extensana =

Scientific classification
- Kingdom: Animalia
- Phylum: Arthropoda
- Class: Insecta
- Order: Lepidoptera
- Family: Tortricidae
- Genus: Acleris
- Species: A. extensana

Binomial name
- Acleris extensana (Walker, 1863)

Synonyms
- Teras extensana Walker, 1863; Peronea agrioma Meyrick, 1920; Oxygrapha comparana Walsingham, in Swinhoe, 1900; Peronea dictylodes Diakonoff, 1947; Oxygrapha dictyodes Meyrick, 1907; Teras divisana Walker, 1863

Species of moth

Acleris extensana is a species of moth of the family Tortricidae first described by Francis Walker in 1863. It is found in Sri Lanka, India (Assam, Punjab), China and Vietnam.

The wingspan is 16–18 mm. The forewings are fuscous, irrorated (sprinkled) with white. The veins and transverse strigulae are fuscous. The hindwings are light grey, faintly strigulated with darker.

The larvae feed on Malus (including Malus sylvestris), Pyrus and Rosa species.
