= Acleris capizziana =

Scientific classification
- Domain: Eukaryota
- Kingdom: Animalia
- Phylum: Arthropoda
- Class: Insecta
- Order: Lepidoptera
- Family: Tortricidae
- Genus: Acleris
- Species: A. capizziana

Binomial name
- Acleris capizziana Obraztsov, 1963

Species of moth

Acleris capizziana is a species of moth of the family Tortricidae. It is found in North America, where it has been recorded from Oregon.

The length of the forewings is about 10 mm.

The larvae have been reared from strawberry.
