= Acleris simpliciana =

Scientific classification
- Domain: Eukaryota
- Kingdom: Animalia
- Phylum: Arthropoda
- Class: Insecta
- Order: Lepidoptera
- Family: Tortricidae
- Genus: Acleris
- Species: A. simpliciana

Binomial name
- Acleris simpliciana (Walsingham, 1879)

Synonyms
- Teras simpliciana Walsingham, 1879; Peronea simpliciana

Species of moth

Acleris simpliciana is a species of moth of the family Tortricidae. It is found in North America, where it has been recorded from Indiana, Manitoba, New York, Ohio and Ontario.

The wingspan is about 11 mm. Adults have been recorded on wing from July to August.
