= Acleris tibetica =

Scientific classification
- Kingdom: Animalia
- Phylum: Arthropoda
- Class: Insecta
- Order: Lepidoptera
- Family: Tortricidae
- Genus: Acleris
- Species: A. tibetica

Binomial name
- Acleris tibetica Razowski, 1964

Species of moth

Acleris tibetica is a species of moth of the family Tortricidae. It is found in Tibet.
