= Acleris gothena =

Scientific classification
- Domain: Eukaryota
- Kingdom: Animalia
- Phylum: Arthropoda
- Class: Insecta
- Order: Lepidoptera
- Family: Tortricidae
- Genus: Acleris
- Species: A. gothena

Binomial name
- Acleris gothena Razowski, 2012

Species of moth

Acleris gothena is a species of moth of the family Tortricidae. It is found in Nepal.

The wingspan is about 26 mm.
