= Acleris placidus =

Scientific classification
- Kingdom: Animalia
- Phylum: Arthropoda
- Clade: Pancrustacea
- Class: Insecta
- Order: Lepidoptera
- Family: Tortricidae
- Genus: Acleris
- Species: A. placidus

Binomial name
- Acleris placidus Yasuda & Kawabe, 1980

Synonyms
- Acleris placida

Species of moth

Acleris placidus is a species of moth of the family Tortricidae. It is found in Japan (Honshu).

The wingspan is 22–28 mm.
