= Acleris compsoptila =

Scientific classification
- Kingdom: Animalia
- Phylum: Arthropoda
- Class: Insecta
- Order: Lepidoptera
- Family: Tortricidae
- Genus: Acleris
- Species: A. compsoptila

Binomial name
- Acleris compsoptila (Meyrick, 1923)

Synonyms
- Peronea compsoptila Meyrick, 1923

Species of moth

Acleris compsoptila is a species of moth of the family Tortricidae. It is found in India (Assam).

The wingspan is about 19 mm. The forewings are violet brown, but lighter and suffused with ochreous towards the costa beyond the middle. The apical area is darker red brown. The hindwings are grey, but lighter anteriorly. Adults have been recorded on wing in November.
