= Acleris sinica =

Scientific classification
- Kingdom: Animalia
- Phylum: Arthropoda
- Clade: Pancrustacea
- Class: Insecta
- Order: Lepidoptera
- Family: Tortricidae
- Genus: Acleris
- Species: A. sinica

Binomial name
- Acleris sinica (Razowski, 1966)

Synonyms
- Croesia sinica Razowski, 1966

Species of insect

Acleris sinica is a species of moth of the family Tortricidae. It is found in China (Tien-Mu-Shan).
