= Acleris duracina =

Scientific classification
- Kingdom: Animalia
- Phylum: Arthropoda
- Class: Insecta
- Order: Lepidoptera
- Family: Tortricidae
- Genus: Acleris
- Species: A. duracina

Binomial name
- Acleris duracina Razowski, 1974

Species of moth

Acleris duracina is a species of moth of the family Tortricidae. It is found in China (Shensi).
