= Acleris mundana =

Scientific classification
- Domain: Eukaryota
- Kingdom: Animalia
- Phylum: Arthropoda
- Class: Insecta
- Order: Lepidoptera
- Family: Tortricidae
- Genus: Acleris
- Species: A. mundana

Binomial name
- Acleris mundana Kuznetsov, 1979

Synonyms
- Acleris pulchella mundana Kuznetsov, 1979

Species of moth

Acleris mundana is a species of moth of the family Tortricidae. It is found in the Russian Far East (Ussuri) and Korea.
