= Acleris expressa =

Scientific classification
- Domain: Eukaryota
- Kingdom: Animalia
- Phylum: Arthropoda
- Class: Insecta
- Order: Lepidoptera
- Family: Tortricidae
- Genus: Acleris
- Species: A. expressa

Binomial name
- Acleris expressa (Filipjev, 1931)

Synonyms
- Peronea expressa Filipjev, 1931

Species of moth

Acleris expressa is a species of moth of the family Tortricidae. It is found in South Korea, China, Russia (Amur) and Japan.

The wingspan is 19–22 mm.

The larvae feed on Fraxinus mandshurica.
