= Acleris cribellata =

Scientific classification
- Kingdom: Animalia
- Phylum: Arthropoda
- Clade: Pancrustacea
- Class: Insecta
- Order: Lepidoptera
- Family: Tortricidae
- Genus: Acleris
- Species: A. cribellata

Binomial name
- Acleris cribellata Falkovitsh, 1965

Species of moth

Acleris cribellata is a species of moth of the family Tortricidae. It is found in the Russian Far East (Ussuri).

Adults are on wing in July and August.

The larvae feed on Acer tegmentosum, Schisandra chinensi and Fraxinus mandschurica.
