= Acleris tigricolor =

Scientific classification
- Domain: Eukaryota
- Kingdom: Animalia
- Phylum: Arthropoda
- Class: Insecta
- Order: Lepidoptera
- Family: Tortricidae
- Genus: Acleris
- Species: A. tigricolor

Binomial name
- Acleris tigricolor (Walsingham, 1900)

Synonyms
- Tortrix tigricolor Walsingham, 1900; Croesia tigricolor; Ergasia tigricolor; Tortrix tricolor Matsumura, 1906

Species of moth

Acleris tigricolor is a species of moth of the family Tortricidae. It is found in the Russian Far East (Ussuri) and Japan (Hokkaido, Honshu).

The wingspan is about 15 mm.

The larvae feed on Alnus species, Micromeles alnifolia and Carpinus laxiflora.
