= Acleris luoyingensis =

Scientific classification
- Kingdom: Animalia
- Phylum: Arthropoda
- Class: Insecta
- Order: Lepidoptera
- Family: Tortricidae
- Genus: Acleris
- Species: A. luoyingensis

Binomial name
- Acleris luoyingensis Kawabe, 1992

Species of moth

Acleris luoyingensis is a species of moth of the family Tortricidae. It is found in Taiwan.
