= Acleris placata =

Scientific classification
- Kingdom: Animalia
- Phylum: Arthropoda
- Class: Insecta
- Order: Lepidoptera
- Family: Tortricidae
- Genus: Acleris
- Species: A. placata

Binomial name
- Acleris placata (Meyrick, 1912)

Synonyms
- Peronea placata Meyrick, 1912

Species of moth

Acleris placata is a species of moth of the family Tortricidae. It is found in India (Assam), Taiwan and Japan.

The wingspan is 14–18 mm.
