= Acleris harenna =

Scientific classification
- Kingdom: Animalia
- Phylum: Arthropoda
- Class: Insecta
- Order: Lepidoptera
- Family: Tortricidae
- Genus: Acleris
- Species: A. harenna

Binomial name
- Acleris harenna Razowski & Trematerra, 2010

Species of moth

Acleris harenna is a species of moth of the family Tortricidae. It is found in Ethiopia, where it is only known from the Bale Mountains. The wingspan is about 18 mm. Males have a brownish head and thorax. The forewings are whitish up to the middle, with brown and grey shading, transitioning to a reddish-brown tone toward the outer part. The wing markings include a brown blotch near the base on the dorsal side, a faint central band, and several fine brown streaks toward the rear. The cilia match the color of the rear part of the wing. The hindwings are grey with lighter-colored cilia. The front half of the female’s forewing is cream-colored with a reddish-brown tint and fine streaks. The middle section of the wing is grey, while the outer part is grey-brown with dark brown spots.

== Taxonomy ==
Acleris harenna was described by the entomologists J. Razowski and P. Trematerra in 2010 on the basis of an adult male specimen collected from the Bale Mountains in Ethiopia. The specific epithet refers to the Harenna Forest, where the species was first collected.

The species resembles A. variegana in external morphology, but is most similar to A. dedita in the appearance of its genitalia.

== Description ==
The wingspan is about 18 mm. In the male, the head and thorax are brownish. The forewings do not widen at the tips; the leading edge (costa) curves gently, and the outer edge (termen) is moderately slanted. The base color of the forewings is whitish up to the middle, with brown and grey shading, transitioning to a reddish-brown tone toward the outer part. The wing markings include a brown blotch near the base on the dorsal side, a faint central band (median fascia), and several fine brown streaks toward the rear. The cilia match the color of the rear part of the wing. The hindwings are grey with lighter-colored cilia.

The front half of the female’s forewing is cream-colored with a reddish-brown tint and fine streaks. The middle section of the wing is grey, while the outer part is grey-brown with dark brown spots. The wing markings include the front edge of a faded central band, which is outlined in white and accented with a few rust-brown spots.

In the male genitalia, the terminal lobes of the tegumen are elongated and rounded. The distal portion of the tuba analis is narrow. The socius has a roughly triangular shape. The sacculus has a sharp angle just past the middle, followed by a clearly wavy (sinuate) curve. Its spined end is long and features a well-developed lobe on the underside. The aedeagus is relatively long and slender, and the cornuti are short.

In the female genitalia, the proximal lobes of the sterigma are long and gradually narrow toward the tip. The antrum is wide at the distal end, slightly less so at the base, and has a narrowed middle section. The signum is a small, plate-like structure.

== Distribution ==
The species is endemic to Ethiopia, where it is known only from the Harenna Forest in the Bale Mountains.
