= Acleris chionocentra =

Scientific classification
- Kingdom: Animalia
- Phylum: Arthropoda
- Class: Insecta
- Order: Lepidoptera
- Family: Tortricidae
- Genus: Acleris
- Species: A. chionocentra

Binomial name
- Acleris chionocentra (Meyrick, 1908)

Synonyms
- Argyrotoxa chionocentra Meyrick, 1908; Acleris chinocentra; Argyrotoxa erythrites Meyrick, 1928

Species of moth

Acleris chionocentra is a species of moth of the family Tortricidae. It is found in India (Assam, Sikkim) and Java and Sumatra.
