= Acleris nectaritis =

Scientific classification
- Kingdom: Animalia
- Phylum: Arthropoda
- Class: Insecta
- Order: Lepidoptera
- Family: Tortricidae
- Genus: Acleris
- Species: A. nectaritis

Binomial name
- Acleris nectaritis (Meyrick, 1912)

Synonyms
- Peronea nectaritis Meyrick, 1912

Species of moth

Acleris nectaritis is a species of moth of the family Tortricidae. It is found in India (Nigrili Hills).
