= Acleris coniferarum =

Scientific classification
- Domain: Eukaryota
- Kingdom: Animalia
- Phylum: Arthropoda
- Class: Insecta
- Order: Lepidoptera
- Family: Tortricidae
- Genus: Acleris
- Species: A. coniferarum

Binomial name
- Acleris coniferarum (Filipjev, 1962)

Synonyms
- Peronea coniferarum Filipjev, 1962; Acleris coniferatum

Species of moth

Acleris coniferarum is a species of moth of the family Tortricidae. It is found in Kazakhstan.

The larvae feed on Abies species and Picea schrenckiana.
