= Acleris lucipara =

Scientific classification
- Kingdom: Animalia
- Phylum: Arthropoda
- Class: Insecta
- Order: Lepidoptera
- Family: Tortricidae
- Genus: Acleris
- Species: A. lucipara

Binomial name
- Acleris lucipara Razowski, 1964

Species of moth

Acleris lucipara is a species of moth of the family Tortricidae. It is found in India (Assam).
