= Acleris bacurana =

Scientific classification
- Domain: Eukaryota
- Kingdom: Animalia
- Phylum: Arthropoda
- Class: Insecta
- Order: Lepidoptera
- Family: Tortricidae
- Genus: Acleris
- Species: A. bacurana

Binomial name
- Acleris bacurana (Turati, 1934)

Synonyms
- Acalla bacurana Turati, 1934

Species of moth

Acleris bacurana is a species of moth of the family Tortricidae. It is found in Libya.
