= Acleris kuznetzovi =

Scientific classification
- Kingdom: Animalia
- Phylum: Arthropoda
- Class: Insecta
- Order: Lepidoptera
- Family: Tortricidae
- Genus: Acleris
- Species: A. kuznetzovi

Binomial name
- Acleris kuznetzovi Razowski, 1989

Synonyms
- Croesia bicolor Kuznetzov, 1964 (preocc. Kawabe, 1963)

Species of moth

Acleris kuznetzovi is a species of moth of the family Tortricidae. It is found in China (Shansi) and the Russian Far East (Primorskij Kraj).

The wingspan is 15–20 mm.

The larvae feed on Populus species (including Populus coreana) and Viburnum burejaeticum.
