= Acleris negundana =

Speckled acleris moth

Scientific classification
- Kingdom: Animalia
- Phylum: Arthropoda
- Clade: Pancrustacea
- Class: Insecta
- Order: Lepidoptera
- Family: Tortricidae
- Genus: Acleris
- Species: A. negundana

Binomial name
- Acleris negundana (Busck, 1940)

Synonyms
- Peronea negundana Busck, 1940

Species of moth

Acleris negundana, the speckled acleris moth, is a species of moth of the family Tortricidae. It is found in North America, where it has been recorded from the District of Columbia, Georgia, Illinois, Indiana, Kentucky, Maine, Manitoba, Maryland, Massachusetts, Minnesota, Mississippi, Missouri, Ohio, Ontario, Virginia, West Virginia and Wisconsin.

The wingspan is 16–17 mm. Adults have been recorded on wing nearly year round.

The larvae feed on Acer negundo.
