= Acleris santacrucis =

Scientific classification
- Kingdom: Animalia
- Phylum: Arthropoda
- Class: Insecta
- Order: Lepidoptera
- Family: Tortricidae
- Genus: Acleris
- Species: A. santacrucis

Binomial name
- Acleris santacrucis Obraztsov, 1963

Species of moth

Acleris santacrucis is a species of moth of the family Tortricidae. It is found in North America, where it has been recorded from California.

The wingspan is about 14 mm. Adults have been recorded on wing from June to August and in October.
