= Acleris semitexta =

Scientific classification
- Kingdom: Animalia
- Phylum: Arthropoda
- Class: Insecta
- Order: Lepidoptera
- Family: Tortricidae
- Genus: Acleris
- Species: A. semitexta

Binomial name
- Acleris semitexta (Meyrick, 1912)

Synonyms
- Peronea semitexta Meyrick, 1912

Species of moth

Acleris semitexta is a species of moth of the family Tortricidae. It is found in India (Sikkim, Punjab).

The wingspan is about 16 mm (0.63 in). The forewings are grey whitish with scattered black dots, as well as a fuscous streak along the dorsum. The hindwings are grey whitish with a few grey strigulae near the apex. Adults have been recorded on wing in November.
