= Acleris fuscopterana =

Scientific classification
- Domain: Eukaryota
- Kingdom: Animalia
- Phylum: Arthropoda
- Class: Insecta
- Order: Lepidoptera
- Family: Tortricidae
- Genus: Acleris
- Species: A. fuscopterana

Binomial name
- Acleris fuscopterana Liu & Bai, 1993

Species of moth

Acleris fuscopterana is a species of moth of the family Tortricidae. It is found in China (Xizang).

The wingspan is about 23.8 mm. Adults have been recorded on wing in May.
