= Acleris senescens =

Scientific classification
- Kingdom: Animalia
- Phylum: Arthropoda
- Clade: Pancrustacea
- Class: Insecta
- Order: Lepidoptera
- Family: Tortricidae
- Genus: Acleris
- Species: A. senescens

Binomial name
- Acleris senescens (Zeller, 1874)

Synonyms
- Teras senescens Zeller, 1874; Peronea senescens

Species of moth

Acleris senescens is a species of moth of the family Tortricidae. It is found in North America, where it is found along the Pacific Coast from British Columbia to California.

The length of the forewings is 10.2–12.2 mm. Adults have been recorded on wing in early spring and late fall in the south, probably in two generations per year.

The larvae possibly feed on Alnus, Ceanothus and Salix species.
