= Acleris osthelderi =

Scientific classification
- Domain: Eukaryota
- Kingdom: Animalia
- Phylum: Arthropoda
- Class: Insecta
- Order: Lepidoptera
- Family: Tortricidae
- Genus: Acleris
- Species: A. osthelderi

Binomial name
- Acleris osthelderi (Obraztsov, 1949)

Synonyms
- Peronea osthelderi Obraztsov, 1949

Species of moth

Acleris osthelderi is a species of moth of the family Tortricidae. It is found in Syria.
