= Acleris caerulescens =

Scientific classification
- Domain: Eukaryota
- Kingdom: Animalia
- Phylum: Arthropoda
- Class: Insecta
- Order: Lepidoptera
- Family: Tortricidae
- Genus: Acleris
- Species: A. caerulescens

Binomial name
- Acleris caerulescens (Walsingham, 1900)

Synonyms
- Oxygrapha caerulescens Walsingham, 1900; Acleris caruelescens Razowski, 1991; Rhacodia staudingeri Kennel, 1901

Species of moth

Acleris caerulescens is a species of moth of the family Tortricidae. It is found in the Russian Far East (Ussuri), eastern China and Japan.

The wingspan is about 24 mm. The forewings are blue-grey with four greyish brown transverse lines. There is a creamy white patch on the costa, preceded and followed by chestnut brown and another smaller creamy brown patch beyond this. The hindwings are greyish brown.

The larvae feed on Pterocarya rhoifolia and Juglans species.
