= Acleris griseopterana =

Scientific classification
- Domain: Eukaryota
- Kingdom: Animalia
- Phylum: Arthropoda
- Class: Insecta
- Order: Lepidoptera
- Family: Tortricidae
- Genus: Acleris
- Species: A. griseopterana

Binomial name
- Acleris griseopterana Liu & Bai, 1993

Species of moth

Acleris griseopterana is a species of moth of the family Tortricidae. It is found in China (Sichuan).

The wingspan is about 19.3 mm. Adults have been recorded on wing in June. The forewings have an ochreous brown triangular area from the two-fifths to four-fifths. There are black scales on the remainder of the wing.
