= Acleris kerincina =

Scientific classification
- Kingdom: Animalia
- Phylum: Arthropoda
- Class: Insecta
- Order: Lepidoptera
- Family: Tortricidae
- Genus: Acleris
- Species: A. kerincina

Binomial name
- Acleris kerincina Razowski, 2012

Species of moth

Acleris kerincina is a species of moth of the family Tortricidae. It is found in western Sumatra at altitudes of about 3,250 meters.

The wingspan is 16–19 mm.

== Etymology ==
The species name refers to Mount Kerinci, the type locality.
