= Acleris nishidai =

Scientific classification
- Domain: Eukaryota
- Kingdom: Animalia
- Phylum: Arthropoda
- Class: Insecta
- Order: Lepidoptera
- Family: Tortricidae
- Genus: Acleris
- Species: A. nishidai

Binomial name
- Acleris nishidai J.W.Brown, 2008

Species of moth

Acleris nishidai is a species of moth of the family Tortricidae. It is found at altitudes ranging from 2,300 to 3,100 meters in the mountains of central Costa Rica.

The length of the forewings is 6.2–7.8 mm.

The larvae feed on Rubus eriocarpus, Rubus vulcanicola and Rubus praecipuus. The larvae have a green body and pale carmel head. They reach a length of 7–8 mm.

== Etymology ==
The species is named for entomologist Kenji Nishida.
