= Acleris pulchella =

Scientific classification
- Kingdom: Animalia
- Phylum: Arthropoda
- Class: Insecta
- Order: Lepidoptera
- Family: Tortricidae
- Genus: Acleris
- Species: A. pulchella

Binomial name
- Acleris pulchella Kawabe, 1963

Species of moth

Acleris pulchella is a species of moth of the family Tortricidae. It is found in Japan (Honshu).

The length of the forewings is 6 mm for males and 7–8 mm for females.
