= Acleris takeuchii =

Scientific classification
- Kingdom: Animalia
- Phylum: Arthropoda
- Clade: Pancrustacea
- Class: Insecta
- Order: Lepidoptera
- Family: Tortricidae
- Genus: Acleris
- Species: A. takeuchii

Binomial name
- Acleris takeuchii Razowski & Yasuda, 1964

Species of moth

Acleris takeuchii is a species of moth of the family Tortricidae. It is found in Japan (Honshu) and Korea.

The length of the forewings is about 7 mm.
