= Acleris busckana =

Scientific classification
- Domain: Eukaryota
- Kingdom: Animalia
- Phylum: Arthropoda
- Class: Insecta
- Order: Lepidoptera
- Family: Tortricidae
- Genus: Acleris
- Species: A. busckana

Binomial name
- Acleris busckana (McDunnough, 1934)

Synonyms
- Peronea busckana McDunnough, 1934

Species of moth

Acleris busckana is a species of moth of the family Tortricidae. It is found in North America, where it has been recorded from Maine, Manitoba, Massachusetts, New Brunswick, New Hampshire, Ohio, Ontario, Quebec and West Virginia.

The wingspan is 20–22 mm for males and about 20 mm for females. Adults have been recorded on wing from March to November.

The larvae feed on Spiraea species (including Spiraea alba).
