= Acleris decolorata =

Scientific classification
- Domain: Eukaryota
- Kingdom: Animalia
- Phylum: Arthropoda
- Class: Insecta
- Order: Lepidoptera
- Family: Tortricidae
- Genus: Acleris
- Species: A. decolorata

Binomial name
- Acleris decolorata Razowski, 1964

Synonyms
- Acleris dedita Razowski, 1974

Species of moth

Acleris decolorata is a species of moth of the family Tortricidae. It is found in India (Assam) and Afghanistan.
