= Acleris diadecta =

Scientific classification
- Kingdom: Animalia
- Phylum: Arthropoda
- Class: Insecta
- Order: Lepidoptera
- Family: Tortricidae
- Genus: Acleris
- Species: A. diadecta

Binomial name
- Acleris diadecta Razowski, 2003

Species of moth

Acleris diadecta is a species of moth of the family Tortricidae. It is found in Vietnam.
