= Acleris thomasi =

Scientific classification
- Kingdom: Animalia
- Phylum: Arthropoda
- Class: Insecta
- Order: Lepidoptera
- Family: Tortricidae
- Genus: Acleris
- Species: A. thomasi

Binomial name
- Acleris thomasi Razowski, 1990

Species of moth

Acleris thomasi is a species of moth of the family Tortricidae. It is found in India (Sikkim).

The wingspan is 21–23 mm.
