= Acleris tremewani =

Scientific classification
- Kingdom: Animalia
- Phylum: Arthropoda
- Class: Insecta
- Order: Lepidoptera
- Family: Tortricidae
- Genus: Acleris
- Species: A. tremewani

Binomial name
- Acleris tremewani Razowski, 1964

Species of moth from Myanmar

Acleris tremewani is a species of moth of the family Tortricidae. It is found in Myanmar.
