= Acleris bicolor =

Scientific classification
- Kingdom: Animalia
- Phylum: Arthropoda
- Class: Insecta
- Order: Lepidoptera
- Family: Tortricidae
- Genus: Acleris
- Species: A. bicolor

Binomial name
- Acleris bicolor Kawabe, 1963

Synonyms
- Acleris dicolor Kawabe, 1963

Species of moth

Acleris bicolor is a species of moth of the family Tortricidae. It is found in Japan.

The length of the forewings is 9 mm for males and 11 mm for females.
