= Acleris hokkaidana =

Scientific classification
- Kingdom: Animalia
- Phylum: Arthropoda
- Clade: Pancrustacea
- Class: Insecta
- Order: Lepidoptera
- Family: Tortricidae
- Genus: Acleris
- Species: A. hokkaidana

Binomial name
- Acleris hokkaidana Razowski & Yasuda, 1964

Species of moth

Acleris hokkaidana is a species of moth of the family Tortricidae. It is found in Japan (Hokkaido).

The length of the forewings is about 11 mm.
