= Acleris orphnocycla =

Scientific classification
- Kingdom: Animalia
- Phylum: Arthropoda
- Class: Insecta
- Order: Lepidoptera
- Family: Tortricidae
- Genus: Acleris
- Species: A. orphnocycla

Binomial name
- Acleris orphnocycla (Meyrick in Caradja & Meyrick, 1937)

Synonyms
- Peronea orphnocycla Meyrick in Caradja & Meyrick, 1937

Species of moth

Acleris orphnocycla is a species of moth of the family Tortricidae. It is found in China (Yunnan), Kashmir and India (Punjab, Uttarakhand).

The wingspan is about 19 mm.

The larvae feed on Coriaria species.
