= Acleris malagassana =

Scientific classification
- Domain: Eukaryota
- Kingdom: Animalia
- Phylum: Arthropoda
- Class: Insecta
- Order: Lepidoptera
- Family: Tortricidae
- Genus: Acleris
- Species: A. malagassana

Binomial name
- Acleris malagassana Diakonoff, 1973

Species of moth

Acleris malagassana is a species of moth of the family Tortricidae. It is found in Madagascar.
