= Acleris stachi =

Scientific classification
- Domain: Eukaryota
- Kingdom: Animalia
- Phylum: Arthropoda
- Class: Insecta
- Order: Lepidoptera
- Family: Tortricidae
- Genus: Acleris
- Species: A. stachi

Binomial name
- Acleris stachi (Razowski, 1953)

Synonyms
- Peronea stachi Razowski, 1953

Species of moth

Acleris stachi is a species of moth of the family Tortricidae. It is found in China (Xinjiang). It was described by Józef Razowski in 1953 (as Peronea stachi).
