= Acleris lucipeta =

Scientific classification
- Kingdom: Animalia
- Phylum: Arthropoda
- Class: Insecta
- Order: Lepidoptera
- Family: Tortricidae
- Genus: Acleris
- Species: A. lucipeta

Binomial name
- Acleris lucipeta Razowski, 1966

Species of moth

Acleris lucipeta is a species of moth of the family Tortricidae. It is found in India (Sikkim) and China (Yunnan).
