= Acleris klotsi =

Scientific classification
- Domain: Eukaryota
- Kingdom: Animalia
- Phylum: Arthropoda
- Class: Insecta
- Order: Lepidoptera
- Family: Tortricidae
- Genus: Acleris
- Species: A. klotsi

Binomial name
- Acleris klotsi Obraztsov, 1963

Species of moth

Acleris klotsi is a species of moth of the family Tortricidae. It is found in North America, where it has been recorded from Arizona.

The length of the forewings is 7–8 mm. Adults have been recorded on wing in July.
