= Acleris dealbata =

Scientific classification
- Kingdom: Animalia
- Phylum: Arthropoda
- Clade: Pancrustacea
- Class: Insecta
- Order: Lepidoptera
- Family: Tortricidae
- Genus: Acleris
- Species: A. dealbata

Binomial name
- Acleris dealbata (Yasuda, 1975)

Synonyms
- Croesia dealbata Yasuda, 1975

Species of moth

Acleris dealbata is a species of moth of the family Tortricidae. It is found in Japan (Hokkaido, Honshyu) and Russia.

The wingspan is 13–16 mm.

The larvae feed on Salix species.
