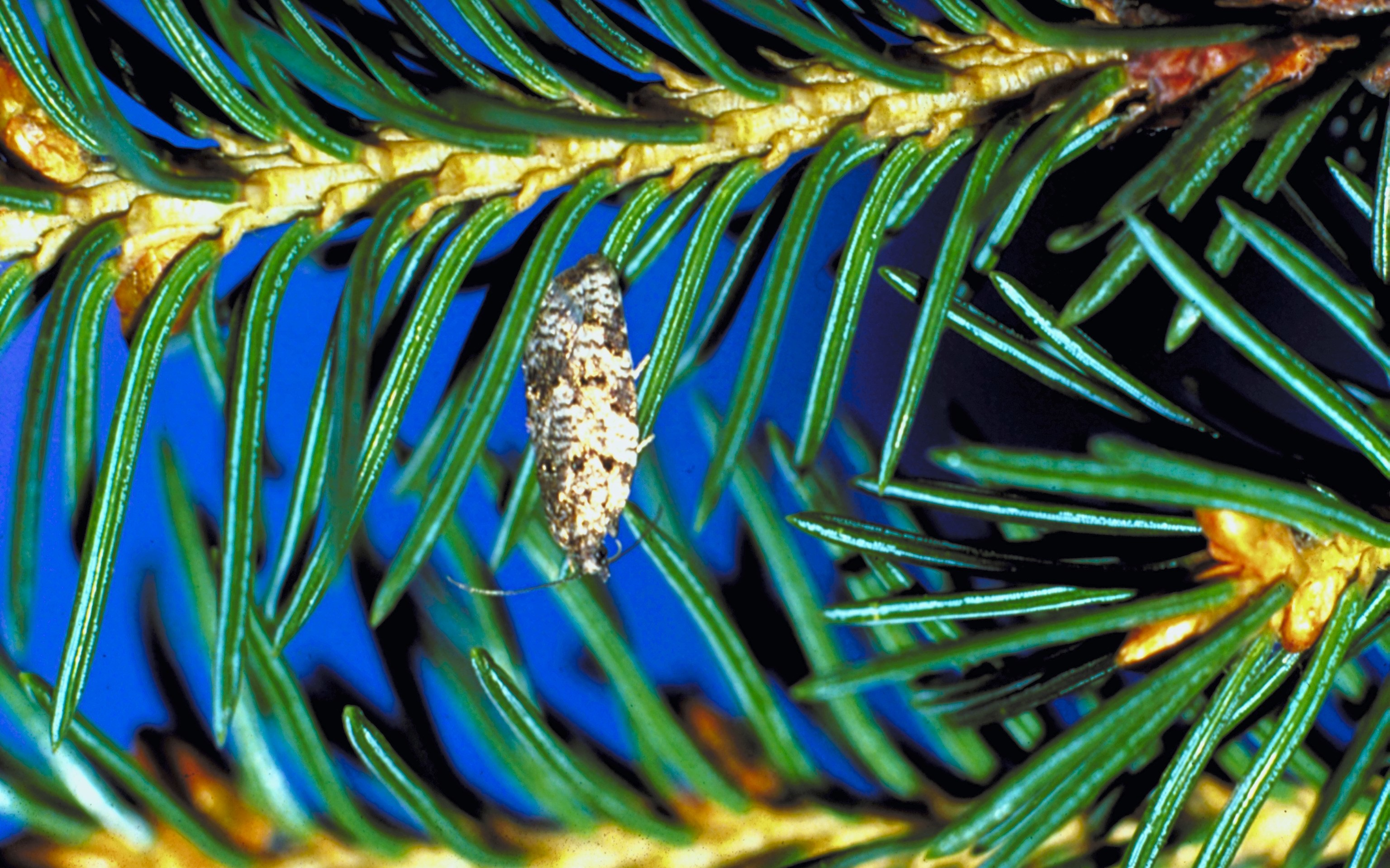

Scientific classification
- Domain: Eukaryota
- Kingdom: Animalia
- Phylum: Arthropoda
- Class: Insecta
- Order: Lepidoptera
- Family: Tortricidae
- Genus: Acleris
- Species: A. gloverana

Binomial name
- Acleris gloverana (Walsingham, 1879)

Synonyms
- Lophoderus gloveranus Walsingham, 1879; Acleris gloveranus

= Acleris gloverana =

Species of moth

Acleris gloverana, the western blackheaded budworm, is a moth of the family Tortricidae. It is found in North America in Alaska, British Columbia and Oregon.

The larvae feed on Tsuga heterophylla, Tsuga mertensiana and Abies species. The species is considered a pest. Severe outbreaks, which occurred on the coast during the 1940s and 1950s covered millions of acres and resulted in considerable tree mortality. Since that time, outbreaks have occurred in the interior from 1965 to 1968 and on Vancouver Island from 1970 to 1973.
