= Acleris phyllosocia =

Scientific classification
- Domain: Eukaryota
- Kingdom: Animalia
- Phylum: Arthropoda
- Class: Insecta
- Order: Lepidoptera
- Family: Tortricidae
- Genus: Acleris
- Species: A. phyllosocia

Binomial name
- Acleris phyllosocia Razowski, 2008

Species of moth

Acleris phyllosocia is a species of moth of the family Tortricidae. It is found in northern Vietnam.

The wingspan is about 21 mm.
