= Acleris phalera =

Scientific classification
- Domain: Eukaryota
- Kingdom: Animalia
- Phylum: Arthropoda
- Class: Insecta
- Order: Lepidoptera
- Family: Tortricidae
- Genus: Acleris
- Species: A. phalera

Binomial name
- Acleris phalera (Kuznetzov, 1964)

Synonyms
- Croesia phalera Kuznetsow, 1964

Species of moth

Acleris phalera is a species of moth of the family Tortricidae. It is found in the Russian Far East (Amur, Ussuri) and Japan.

The wingspan is about 14 mm.

The larvae feed on Fragaria limunae.
