= Acleris hudsoniana =

Scientific classification
- Kingdom: Animalia
- Phylum: Arthropoda
- Class: Insecta
- Order: Lepidoptera
- Family: Tortricidae
- Genus: Acleris
- Species: A. hudsoniana

Binomial name
- Acleris hudsoniana (Walker, 1863)

Synonyms
- Teras hudsoniana Walker, 1863; Peronea hudsoniana; Teras brewsteriana Robinson, 1869

Species of moth

Acleris hudsoniana is a species of moth of the family Tortricidae. It is found in North America, where it has been recorded from Alaska, Alberta, Indiana, Maine, Manitoba, Massachusetts, Michigan, New Hampshire, New Jersey, Ontario, Saskatchewan, West Virginia and Wisconsin.

The wingspan is 16–20 mm. Adults have been recorded on wing from March to April and from September to November.

The larvae feed on Betula papyrifera, Picea glauca, Populus balsamifera, Populus tremuloides, Alnus and Salix species.
