= Acleris paracinderella =

Scientific classification
- Kingdom: Animalia
- Phylum: Arthropoda
- Clade: Pancrustacea
- Class: Insecta
- Order: Lepidoptera
- Family: Tortricidae
- Genus: Acleris
- Species: A. paracinderella

Binomial name
- Acleris paracinderella Powell, 1964

Species of moth

Acleris paracinderella is a species of moth of the family Tortricidae. It is found in North America, where it has been recorded from California.

The wingspan is 18–19 mm. Adults have been recorded on wing in February and from May to July.

The larvae feed on Prunus dumosa, Prunus fremontii, Prunus virginiana and Betula species.
