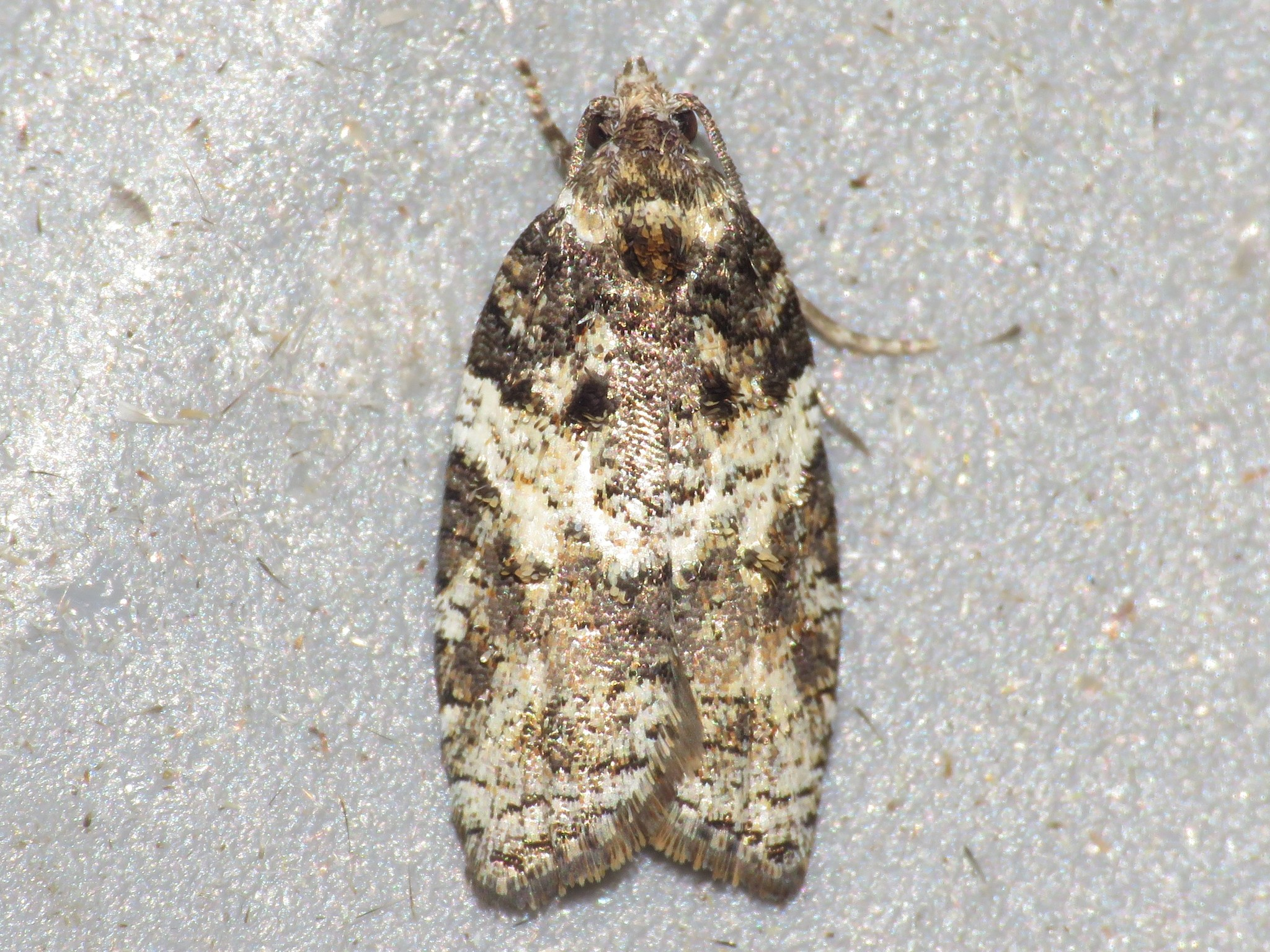

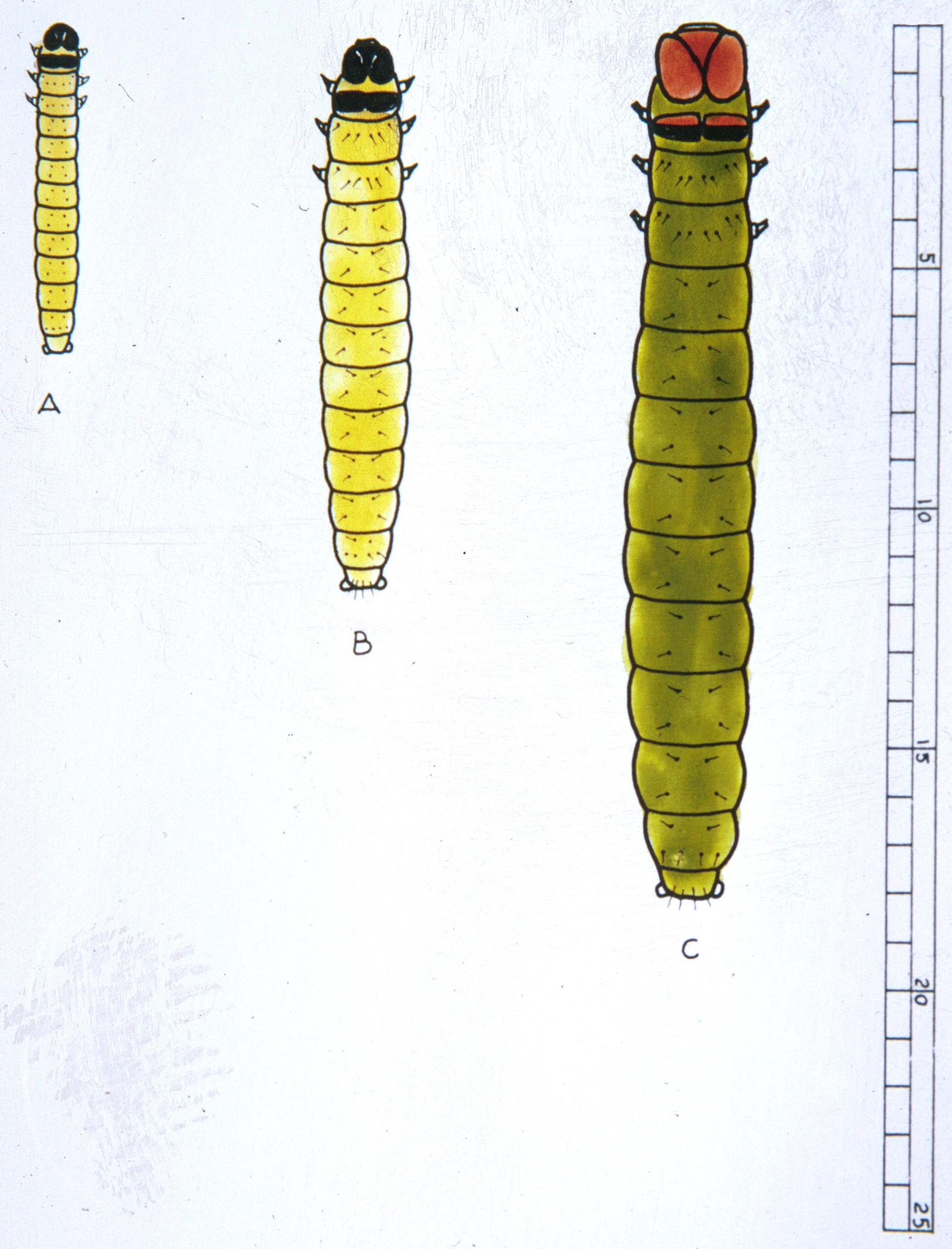
- Adult (top) and larva (bottom)

Scientific classification
- Domain: Eukaryota
- Kingdom: Animalia
- Phylum: Arthropoda
- Class: Insecta
- Order: Lepidoptera
- Family: Tortricidae
- Genus: Acleris
- Species: A. variana

Binomial name
- Acleris variana (Fernald, 1886)

Synonyms
- Teras variana Fernald, 1886; Peronea angusana Fernald, 1892

= Acleris variana =

Eastern blackheaded budworm

Species of moth

Acleris variana, the eastern blackheaded budworm, is a moth of the family Tortricidae. It is found in Newfoundland and Cape Breton Island and the north-eastern United States, across the coniferous forest region of Canada, presumably to Saskatchewan or eastern Alberta.

The larvae mainly feed on Abies balsamea (balsam fir) and Picea glauca (white spruce).
