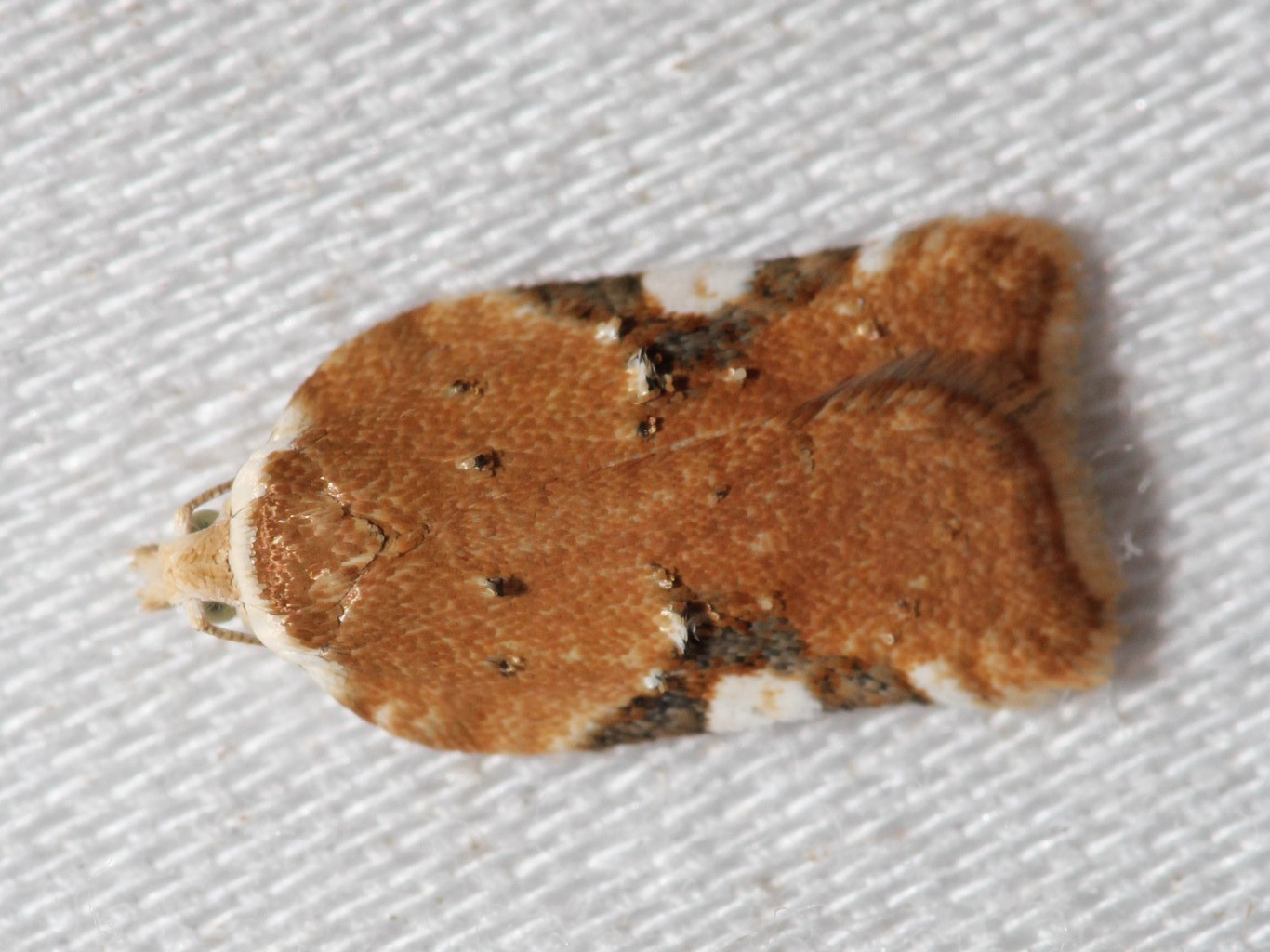

Scientific classification
- Domain: Eukaryota
- Kingdom: Animalia
- Phylum: Arthropoda
- Class: Insecta
- Order: Lepidoptera
- Family: Tortricidae
- Genus: Acleris
- Species: A. cervinana

Binomial name
- Acleris cervinana (Fernald, 1882)

Synonyms
- Teras cervinana Fernald, 1882; Peronea cervinana; Teras americana Fernald, 1882

= Acleris cervinana =

Species of moth

Acleris cervinana is a species of moth of the family Tortricidae. It is found in North America, where it has been recorded across Canada from British Columbia to New Brunswick and south to California and Alabama in the United States.

The wingspan is 15–17 mm. Adults have been recorded on wing nearly year round.

The larvae feed on Betula alleghaniensis, Corylus and Alnus species.
