= Acleris sagmatias =

Scientific classification
- Kingdom: Animalia
- Phylum: Arthropoda
- Class: Insecta
- Order: Lepidoptera
- Family: Tortricidae
- Genus: Acleris
- Species: A. sagmatias

Binomial name
- Acleris sagmatias (Meyrick, 1905)

Synonyms
- Oxygrapha sagmatias Meyrick, 1905

Species of moth

Acleris sagmatias is a species of moth of the family Tortricidae first described by Edward Meyrick in 1905. It is found in Sri Lanka.

This species has a wingspan of 17–20 mm.
