= Acleris medea =

Scientific classification
- Domain: Eukaryota
- Kingdom: Animalia
- Phylum: Arthropoda
- Class: Insecta
- Order: Lepidoptera
- Family: Tortricidae
- Genus: Acleris
- Species: A. medea

Binomial name
- Acleris medea Diakonoff, 1976

Species of moth

Acleris medea is a species of moth of the family Tortricidae. It is found in Nepal.
