= Acleris uniformis =

Scientific classification
- Domain: Eukaryota
- Kingdom: Animalia
- Phylum: Arthropoda
- Class: Insecta
- Order: Lepidoptera
- Family: Tortricidae
- Genus: Acleris
- Species: A. uniformis

Binomial name
- Acleris uniformis (Filipjev, 1931)

Synonyms
- Peronea uniformis Filipjev, 1931

Species of moth

Acleris uniformis is a species of moth of the family Tortricidae. It is found in Russian Far East (Ussuri), South Korea and Japan (Hokkaido, Honshu).

The wingspan is about 16 mm.
