= Acleris rubi =

Scientific classification
- Kingdom: Animalia
- Phylum: Arthropoda
- Class: Insecta
- Order: Lepidoptera
- Family: Tortricidae
- Genus: Acleris
- Species: A. rubi

Binomial name
- Acleris rubi Razowski, 2005

Species of moth

Acleris rubi is a species of moth of the family Tortricidae. It is found in South Africa.

The larvae feed on Rubus rigidus.
