= Acleris blanda =

Scientific classification
- Kingdom: Animalia
- Phylum: Arthropoda
- Clade: Pancrustacea
- Class: Insecta
- Order: Lepidoptera
- Family: Tortricidae
- Genus: Acleris
- Species: A. blanda

Binomial name
- Acleris blanda (Yasuda, 1975)

Synonyms
- Croesia blanda Yasuda, 1975

Species of moth

Acleris blanda is a species of moth of the family Tortricidae. It is found in Japan (Honshu).

The wingspan is 11–15 mm.
