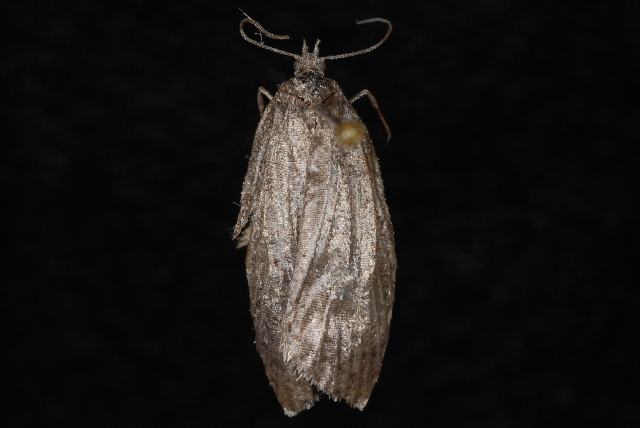

Scientific classification
- Kingdom: Animalia
- Phylum: Arthropoda
- Class: Insecta
- Order: Lepidoptera
- Family: Tortricidae
- Genus: Acleris
- Species: A. caliginosana

Binomial name
- Acleris caliginosana (Walker, 1863)

Synonyms
- Teras caliginosana Walker, 1863; Peronea caliginosana

= Acleris caliginosana =

Species of moth

Acleris caliginosana is a species of moth of the family Tortricidae. It is found in North America, where it has been recorded from Alberta, British Columbia, California, Colorado, Idaho, Maine, Montana, New Brunswick, Nova Scotia, Ontario, Quebec, Washington and Wisconsin.

The wingspan is 24–29 mm. Adults have been recorded on wing nearly year round.

The larvae feed on Alnus incana, Alnus rubra and Betula papyrifera.
