= Acleris imitatrix =

Scientific classification
- Kingdom: Animalia
- Phylum: Arthropoda
- Class: Insecta
- Order: Lepidoptera
- Family: Tortricidae
- Genus: Acleris
- Species: A. imitatrix

Binomial name
- Acleris imitatrix (Razowski, 1975)

Synonyms
- Croesia imitatrix Razowski, 1975

Species of moth

Acleris imitatrix is a species of moth of the family Tortricidae. It is found in China (Chekiang).

The wingspan is about 16 mm.
