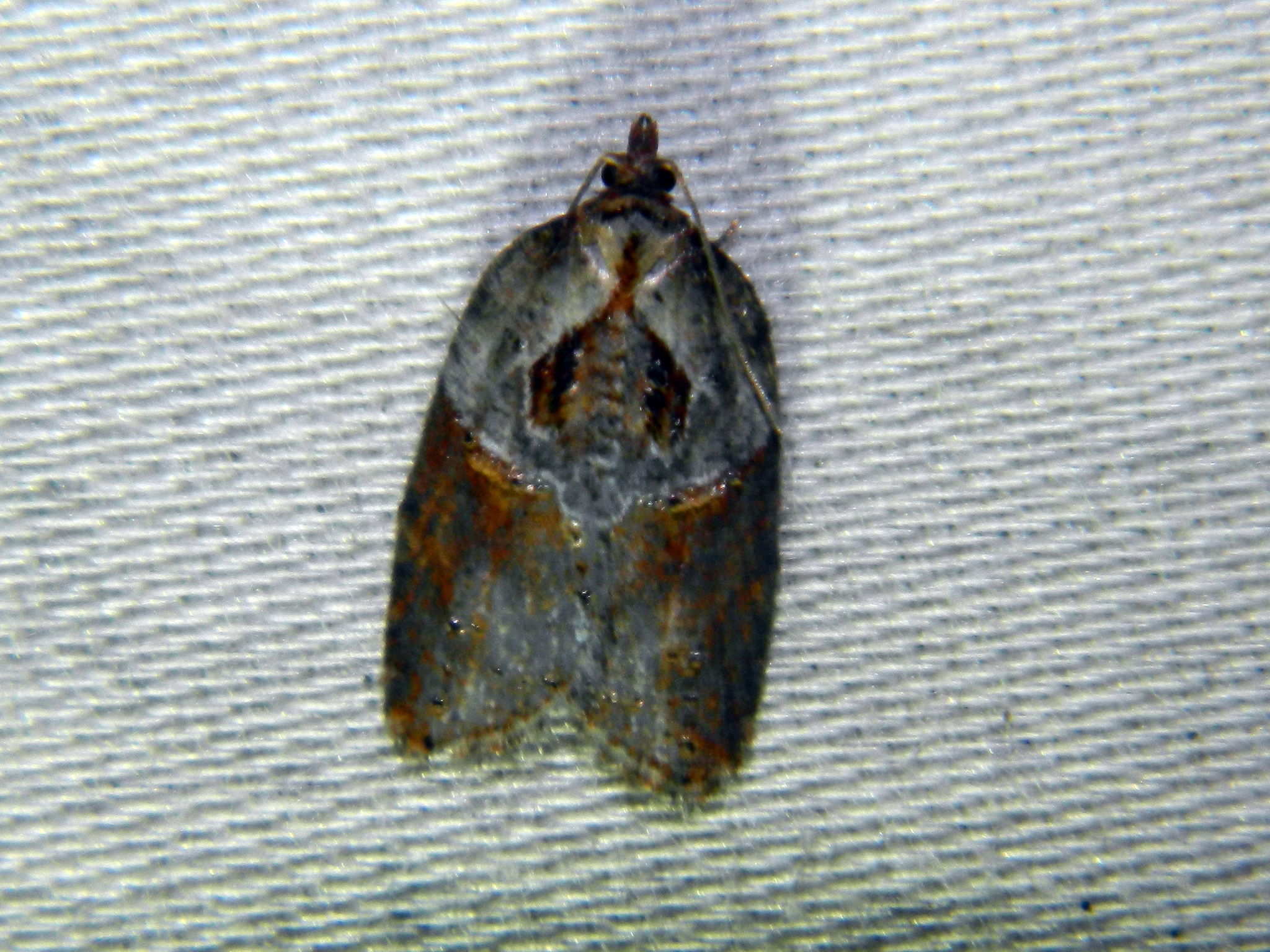

Scientific classification
- Domain: Eukaryota
- Kingdom: Animalia
- Phylum: Arthropoda
- Class: Insecta
- Order: Lepidoptera
- Family: Tortricidae
- Genus: Acleris
- Species: A. inana

Binomial name
- Acleris inana (Robinson, 1869)

Synonyms
- Teras inana Robinson, 1869; Peronea inana

= Acleris inana =

Species of moth

Acleris inana is a species of moth in the family Tortricidae. It is found in North America, where it has been recorded from Alberta, Kentucky, Maine, Missouri and Ontario.

The wingspan is about 19 mm. Adults have been recorded on wing in February and from August to September.

The larvae feed on Alnus, Betula and Corylus species.
