= Acleris recula =

Scientific classification
- Kingdom: Animalia
- Phylum: Arthropoda
- Clade: Pancrustacea
- Class: Insecta
- Order: Lepidoptera
- Family: Tortricidae
- Genus: Acleris
- Species: A. recula

Binomial name
- Acleris recula Razowski, 1974

Species of moth

Acleris recula is a species of moth of the family Tortricidae. It is found in China (Zhejiang).
