= Acleris tabida =

Scientific classification
- Kingdom: Animalia
- Phylum: Arthropoda
- Class: Insecta
- Order: Lepidoptera
- Family: Tortricidae
- Genus: Acleris
- Species: A. tabida

Binomial name
- Acleris tabida Razowski, 1975

Species of moth

Acleris tabida is a species of moth of the family Tortricidae. It is found in China (Yunnan).
