= Acleris aenigmana =

Scientific classification
- Kingdom: Animalia
- Phylum: Arthropoda
- Clade: Pancrustacea
- Class: Insecta
- Order: Lepidoptera
- Family: Tortricidae
- Genus: Acleris
- Species: A. aenigmana

Binomial name
- Acleris aenigmana Powell, 1964

Species of moth

Acleris aenigmana is a species of moth of the family Tortricidae. It is found in North America, where it has been recorded from California and Utah.

Adults have been recorded on wing in April, June and October.

The larvae feed on Hypericum perforatum and Prunus emarginata.
