= Acleris ochropterana =

Scientific classification
- Domain: Eukaryota
- Kingdom: Animalia
- Phylum: Arthropoda
- Class: Insecta
- Order: Lepidoptera
- Family: Tortricidae
- Genus: Acleris
- Species: A. ochropterana

Binomial name
- Acleris ochropterana Liu & Bai, 1993

Species of moth

Acleris ochropterana is a species of moth of the family Tortricidae. It is found in China (Xizang).

The wingspan is about 20 mm (0.79 in). Adults have been recorded on wing in June.
