= Acleris schiasma =

Scientific classification
- Kingdom: Animalia
- Phylum: Arthropoda
- Class: Insecta
- Order: Lepidoptera
- Family: Tortricidae
- Genus: Acleris
- Species: A. schiasma

Binomial name
- Acleris schiasma Razowski, 2012

Species of moth

Acleris schiasma is a species of moth of the family Tortricidae. It is found in Thailand.

The wingspan is about 14 mm.
