= Acleris albopterana =

Scientific classification
- Kingdom: Animalia
- Phylum: Arthropoda
- Clade: Pancrustacea
- Class: Insecta
- Order: Lepidoptera
- Family: Tortricidae
- Genus: Acleris
- Species: A. albopterana

Binomial name
- Acleris albopterana Liu & Bai, 1993

Species of moth

Acleris albopterana is a species of moth of the family Tortricidae. It is found in China (Qinghai).

The wingspan is 18.5–21.4 mm. The basal half of the costa is white and the apical half is brown with greyish-brown scales. Adults have been recorded on wing in August and October.
