= Acleris macropterana =

Scientific classification
- Domain: Eukaryota
- Kingdom: Animalia
- Phylum: Arthropoda
- Class: Insecta
- Order: Lepidoptera
- Family: Tortricidae
- Genus: Acleris
- Species: A. macropterana

Binomial name
- Acleris macropterana Liu & Bai, 1993

Species of moth

Acleris macropterana is a species of moth of the family Tortricidae. It is found in China (Shanxi).

The wingspan is about 26 mm.
