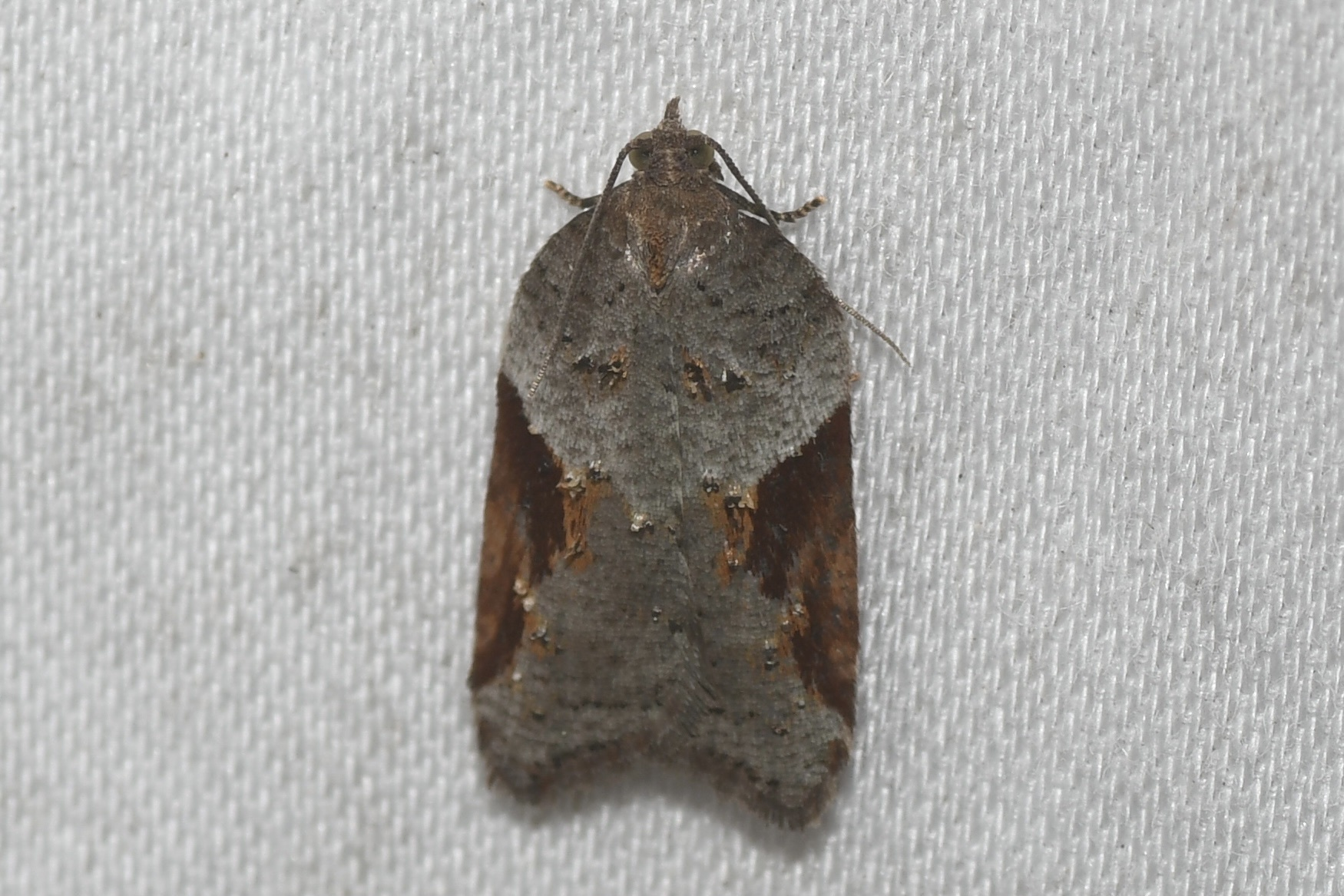

Scientific classification
- Kingdom: Animalia
- Phylum: Arthropoda
- Class: Insecta
- Order: Lepidoptera
- Family: Tortricidae
- Genus: Acleris
- Species: A. macdunnoughi

Binomial name
- Acleris macdunnoughi Obraztsov, 1963

= Acleris macdunnoughi =

Species of moth

Acleris macdunnoughi is a species of moth in the family Tortricidae. It is found in North America, where it has been recorded from Alberta, Kentucky, Maine, Massachusetts, Michigan, Minnesota, Montana, New Brunswick, North Carolina, Ohio, Ontario, Pennsylvania, Quebec, Tennessee, Vermont, Washington and West Virginia.

The length of the forewings is 8–9 mm (0.31–0.35 in). Adults have been recorded on wing from April to October.

The larvae feed on Rubus species and Spiraea latifolia.
