= Acleris stadiana =

Scientific classification
- Domain: Eukaryota
- Kingdom: Animalia
- Phylum: Arthropoda
- Class: Insecta
- Order: Lepidoptera
- Family: Tortricidae
- Genus: Acleris
- Species: A. stadiana

Binomial name
- Acleris stadiana (Barnes & Busck, 1920)

Synonyms
- Peronea stadiana Barnes & Busck, 1920

Species of moth

Acleris stadiana is a species of moth of the family Tortricidae first described by William Barnes and August Busck in 1920. It is found in North America, where it has been recorded from Ontario.
