= Acleris delicata =

Scientific classification
- Kingdom: Animalia
- Phylum: Arthropoda
- Clade: Pancrustacea
- Class: Insecta
- Order: Lepidoptera
- Family: Tortricidae
- Genus: Acleris
- Species: A. delicata

Binomial name
- Acleris delicata (Yasuda & Kawabe, 1980)

Synonyms
- Croesia delicata Yasuda & Kawabe, 1980

Species of moth

Acleris delicata is a species of moth of the family Tortricidae. It is found in Japan (Honshu).

The wingspan is 14–15.5 mm.
