= Acleris maculopterana =

Scientific classification
- Domain: Eukaryota
- Kingdom: Animalia
- Phylum: Arthropoda
- Class: Insecta
- Order: Lepidoptera
- Family: Tortricidae
- Genus: Acleris
- Species: A. maculopterana

Binomial name
- Acleris maculopterana Liu & Bai, 1993

Species of moth

Acleris maculopterana is a species of moth of the family Tortricidae. It is found in China (Sichuan).

The wingspan is about 17.2 mm. Adults have been recorded on wing in May.
