= Acleris hapalactis =

Scientific classification
- Kingdom: Animalia
- Phylum: Arthropoda
- Clade: Pancrustacea
- Class: Insecta
- Order: Lepidoptera
- Family: Tortricidae
- Genus: Acleris
- Species: A. hapalactis

Binomial name
- Acleris hapalactis (Meyrick, 1912)

Synonyms
- Peronea hapalactis Meyrick, 1912

Species of moth

Acleris hapalactis is a species of moth of the family Tortricidae. It is found in India (Assam).

The wingspan is 15–16 mm. The forewings are light yellow-ochreous, with a few scattered minute black tufts. The veins are marked with fine fuscous lines on the posterior half. There is also a faint triangular patch of ferruginous-ochreous suffusion on the costa and a ferruginous-ochreous terminal fascia. The hindwings are light grey. Adults have been recorded on wing in July.
