= Acleris braunana =

Scientific classification
- Domain: Eukaryota
- Kingdom: Animalia
- Phylum: Arthropoda
- Class: Insecta
- Order: Lepidoptera
- Family: Tortricidae
- Genus: Acleris
- Species: A. braunana

Binomial name
- Acleris braunana (McDunnough, 1934)

Synonyms
- Peronea braunana McDunnough, 1934

Species of moth

Acleris braunana is a species of moth of the family Tortricidae. It is found in North America, where it has been recorded from Alberta, British Columbia, Indiana, Maine, Michigan, New Brunswick, New York, Nova Scotia, Oregon, Pennsylvania, Quebec, Saskatchewan, West Virginia and Wisconsin.

The wingspan is about 15 mm. Adults have been recorded on wing from March to December.

The larvae feed on Alnus (including Alnus incana, Alnus rubra) and Betula species (including Betula papyrifera).
