= Acleris sinuosaria =

Scientific classification
- Kingdom: Animalia
- Phylum: Arthropoda
- Class: Insecta
- Order: Lepidoptera
- Family: Tortricidae
- Genus: Acleris
- Species: A. sinuosaria

Binomial name
- Acleris sinuosaria Razowski, 1964

Species of moth

Acleris sinuosaria is a species of moth of the family Tortricidae. It is found in China (Yunnan).
