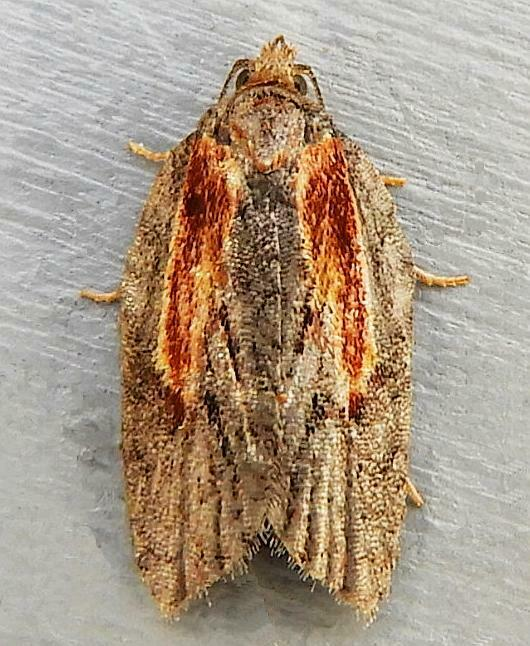

Scientific classification
- Kingdom: Animalia
- Phylum: Arthropoda
- Class: Insecta
- Order: Lepidoptera
- Family: Tortricidae
- Genus: Acleris
- Species: A. youngana

Binomial name
- Acleris youngana (McDunnough, 1934)

Synonyms
- Peronea youngana McDunnough, 1934

= Acleris youngana =

Species of moth

Acleris youngana is a species of moth of the family Tortricidae. It is found in North America, where it has been recorded from Alabama, Maine, New Hampshire, Ontario, Pennsylvania, Quebec, Vermont and West Virginia.

The wingspan is 15–18 mm. Adults have been recorded on wing from April to May and from October to November.
