= Acleris rosella =

Scientific classification
- Domain: Eukaryota
- Kingdom: Animalia
- Phylum: Arthropoda
- Class: Insecta
- Order: Lepidoptera
- Family: Tortricidae
- Genus: Acleris
- Species: A. rosella

Binomial name
- Acleris rosella (Liu & Bai, 1987)

Synonyms
- Croesia rosella Liu & Bai, 1987

Species of insect

Acleris rosella is a species of moth of the family Tortricidae. It is found in China.

The wingspan is about 13 mm.

The larvae feed on Rosa acicularis.
