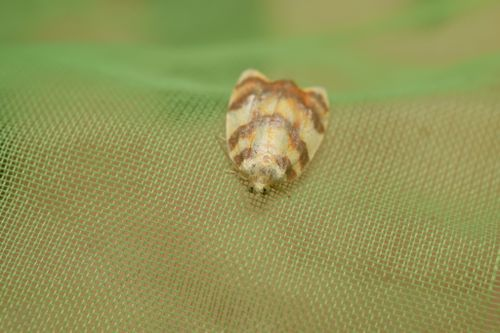

Scientific classification
- Kingdom: Animalia
- Phylum: Arthropoda
- Class: Insecta
- Order: Lepidoptera
- Family: Tortricidae
- Genus: Acleris
- Species: A. leechi

Binomial name
- Acleris leechi (Walsingham, 1900)

Synonyms
- Tortrix leechi Walsingham, 1900; Croesia leechi; Tortrix sumptuosana Caradja, 1939

= Acleris leechi =

Species of moth

Acleris leechi is a species of moth of the family Tortricidae. It is found in Korea, China, Japan (Hokkaido, Honshu, Yokohama, Shikoku) and Russia (Ussuri, Vladivostok, eastern Siberia).

The wingspan is 13–17 mm.

The larvae feed on Quercus species.
