= Acleris fuscotogata =

Scientific classification
- Domain: Eukaryota
- Kingdom: Animalia
- Phylum: Arthropoda
- Class: Insecta
- Order: Lepidoptera
- Family: Tortricidae
- Genus: Acleris
- Species: A. fuscotogata

Binomial name
- Acleris fuscotogata (Walsingham, 1900)

Synonyms
- Oxygrapha fuscotogata Walsingham, 1900; Rhacodia pretiosana Kennel, 1901

Species of moth

Acleris fuscotogata is a species of moth of the family Tortricidae. It is found in the Russian Far East (Ussuri, Siberia) and Japan.

The wingspan is 14–15 mm. The forewings are bright yellow ochreous on the basal half and reddish brown beyond. The hindwings are brownish fuscous.

The larvae feed on Quercus serrata.
