= Acleris nigriradix =

Scientific classification
- Domain: Eukaryota
- Kingdom: Animalia
- Phylum: Arthropoda
- Class: Insecta
- Order: Lepidoptera
- Family: Tortricidae
- Genus: Acleris
- Species: A. nigriradix

Binomial name
- Acleris nigriradix (Filipjev, 1931)

Synonyms
- Peronea nigriradix Filipjev, 1931

Species of moth

Acleris nigriradix is a species of moth of the family Tortricidae. It is found in China, Korea, Japan and the Russian Far East (eastern Siberia).

The wingspan is 20 mm for males and 19 mm for females.
