= Acleris ruwenzorica =

Scientific classification
- Kingdom: Animalia
- Phylum: Arthropoda
- Class: Insecta
- Order: Lepidoptera
- Family: Tortricidae
- Genus: Acleris
- Species: A. ruwenzorica

Binomial name
- Acleris ruwenzorica Razowski, 2005

Species of moth

Acleris ruwenzorica is a species of moth of the family Tortricidae. It is found in the Democratic Republic of Congo and Uganda.
