= Acleris elaearcha =

Scientific classification
- Kingdom: Animalia
- Phylum: Arthropoda
- Class: Insecta
- Order: Lepidoptera
- Family: Tortricidae
- Genus: Acleris
- Species: A. elaearcha

Binomial name
- Acleris elaearcha (Meyrick, 1908)

Synonyms
- Argyrotoxa elaearcha Meyrick, 1908

Species of moth

Acleris elaearcha is a species of moth of the family Tortricidae. It is found in India (Assam).
