= Acleris thylacitis =

Scientific classification
- Kingdom: Animalia
- Phylum: Arthropoda
- Class: Insecta
- Order: Lepidoptera
- Family: Tortricidae
- Genus: Acleris
- Species: A. thylacitis

Binomial name
- Acleris thylacitis (Meyrick, 1920)

Synonyms
- Peronea thylacitis Meyrick, 1920

Species of moth

Acleris thylacitis is a species of moth of the family Tortricidae. It is found in Kenya and Uganda.
