= Acleris potosiana =

Scientific classification
- Kingdom: Animalia
- Phylum: Arthropoda
- Clade: Pancrustacea
- Class: Insecta
- Order: Lepidoptera
- Family: Tortricidae
- Genus: Acleris
- Species: A. potosiana

Binomial name
- Acleris potosiana Razowski & Becker, 2003

Species of moth

Acleris potosiana is a species of moth of the family Tortricidae. It is found in Mexico (Nuevo León).
