= Acleris incognita =

Scientific classification
- Domain: Eukaryota
- Kingdom: Animalia
- Phylum: Arthropoda
- Class: Insecta
- Order: Lepidoptera
- Family: Tortricidae
- Genus: Acleris
- Species: A. incognita

Binomial name
- Acleris incognita Obraztsov, 1963

Species of moth

Acleris incognita is a species of moth of the family Tortricidae. It is found in North America, where it has been recorded from Idaho.

The length of the forewings is about 10.5 mm. The forewings are dark brownish grey. The hindwings are pale greyish-white. Adults have been recorded on wing in August.

The larvae feed on Alnus species.
