= Acleris chloroma =

Scientific classification
- Kingdom: Animalia
- Phylum: Arthropoda
- Class: Insecta
- Order: Lepidoptera
- Family: Tortricidae
- Genus: Acleris
- Species: A. chloroma

Binomial name
- Acleris chloroma Razowski, 1993

Species of moth

Acleris chloroma is a species of moth of the family Tortricidae. It is found in Uganda.

The wingspan is about 26 mm.
