= Acleris tunicatana =

Scientific classification
- Domain: Eukaryota
- Kingdom: Animalia
- Phylum: Arthropoda
- Class: Insecta
- Order: Lepidoptera
- Family: Tortricidae
- Genus: Acleris
- Species: A. tunicatana

Binomial name
- Acleris tunicatana (Walsingham, 1900)

Synonyms
- Oxygrapha tunicatana Walsingham, 1900; Acleris kurokoi Yasuda, 1965

Species of moth

Acleris tunicatana is a species of moth of the family Tortricidae. It is found in Japan.

The wingspan is about 22 mm. The forewings are dark purple or purplish fuscous with scattered groups of scales. There are mixed purplish fuscous and greyish cinereous scales on the costa. The hindwings are whitish grey, tinged with pale cinereous towards the apex.
