= Acleris cameroonana =

Scientific classification
- Kingdom: Animalia
- Phylum: Arthropoda
- Class: Insecta
- Order: Lepidoptera
- Family: Tortricidae
- Genus: Acleris
- Species: A. cameroonana

Binomial name
- Acleris cameroonana Razowski, 2012

Species of moth

Acleris cameroonana is a species of moth of the family Tortricidae. It was described by Józef Razowski in 2012 and is endemic to Cameroon.

The wingspan is about 23 millimetres (0.91 in).

== Etymology ==
The species name refers to the type locality.
