= Acleris porphyrocentra =

Scientific classification
- Kingdom: Animalia
- Phylum: Arthropoda
- Class: Insecta
- Order: Lepidoptera
- Family: Tortricidae
- Genus: Acleris
- Species: A. porphyrocentra

Binomial name
- Acleris porphyrocentra (Meyrick in Caradja & Meyrick, 1937)

Synonyms
- Peronea porphyrocentra Meyrick, 1937

Species of moth

Acleris porphyrocentra is a species of moth of the family Tortricidae. It is found in China (Yunnan).
