= Acleris nigropterana =

Scientific classification
- Domain: Eukaryota
- Kingdom: Animalia
- Phylum: Arthropoda
- Class: Insecta
- Order: Lepidoptera
- Family: Tortricidae
- Genus: Acleris
- Species: A. nigropterana

Binomial name
- Acleris nigropterana Liu & Bai, 1993

Species of moth

Acleris nigropterana is a species of moth of the family Tortricidae. It is found in China (Xizang).

The wingspan is about 21.5 mm. The forewings are brownish black. The hindwings are greyish white. Adults have been recorded on wing in May.
