= Acleris proximana =

Scientific classification
- Domain: Eukaryota
- Kingdom: Animalia
- Phylum: Arthropoda
- Class: Insecta
- Order: Lepidoptera
- Family: Tortricidae
- Genus: Acleris
- Species: A. proximana

Binomial name
- Acleris proximana (Caradja, 1927)

Synonyms
- Acalla proximana Caradja, 1927

Species of moth

Acleris proximana is a species of moth of the family Tortricidae. It is found in South Korea and China.

The wingspan is about 15 mm.
