= Acleris aestuosa =

Scientific classification
- Kingdom: Animalia
- Phylum: Arthropoda
- Clade: Pancrustacea
- Class: Insecta
- Order: Lepidoptera
- Family: Tortricidae
- Genus: Acleris
- Species: A. aestuosa

Binomial name
- Acleris aestuosa Yasuda, 1965

Species of moth

Acleris aestuosa is a species of moth of the family Tortricidae. It is found in Japan (Shikoku).

The wingspan is 18–21 mm.

The larvae feed on Fagus crenata.
