= Acleris dryochyta =

Scientific classification
- Kingdom: Animalia
- Phylum: Arthropoda
- Class: Insecta
- Order: Lepidoptera
- Family: Tortricidae
- Genus: Acleris
- Species: A. dryochyta

Binomial name
- Acleris dryochyta (Meyrick in Caradja & Meyrick, 1937)

Synonyms
- Tortrix dryochyta Meyrick, 1937

Species of moth

Acleris dryochyta is a species of moth of the family Tortricidae. It is found in China (Yunnan).
