= Acleris emera =

Scientific classification
- Kingdom: Animalia
- Phylum: Arthropoda
- Class: Insecta
- Order: Lepidoptera
- Family: Tortricidae
- Genus: Acleris
- Species: A. emera

Binomial name
- Acleris emera Razowski, 1993

Species of moth

Acleris emera is a species of moth of the family Tortricidae. It is found in Bolivia.
