= Acleris matthewsi =

Scientific classification
- Kingdom: Animalia
- Phylum: Arthropoda
- Class: Insecta
- Order: Lepidoptera
- Family: Tortricidae
- Genus: Acleris
- Species: A. matthewsi

Binomial name
- Acleris matthewsi Razowski, 1986

Species of moth

Acleris matthewsi is a species of moth of the family Tortricidae. It is found in Peru.

The wingspan is about 18 mm.
