= List of moths of Japan (Zygaenoidea-Tortricoidea) =

Partial list of Japanese moths

This is a list of the Japanese species of the superfamilies Zygaenoidea, Sesioidea, Cossoidea and Tortricoidea. It also acts as an index to the species articles and forms part of the full List of moths of Japan.

== Epipyropidae ==
- セミヤドリガ — Epipomponia nawai (Dyar, 1904)
- ハゴロモヤドリガ — Epiricania hagoromo Kato, 1939

== Limacodidae ==
- オガサワライラガ — Belippa boninensis (Matsumura, 1931)
- ツマジロイラガ — Belippa horrida Walker, 1865
- オキナワシロイラガ — Narosa azumai Inoue, 1976
- カバフシロイラガ — Narosa corusca amamiana Kawazoe & Ogata, [1963]
- ヒメシロイラガ — Narosa edoensis Kawada, 1930
- ウスマダライラガ — Narosa fulgens (Leech, 1889)
- ヒメマダライラガ — Kitanola masayukii Sasaki, 1998
- ミナミマダライラガ — Kitanola meridiana Sasaki, 1998
- ビロードマダライラガ — Kitanola sachalinensis Matsumura, 1925
- マダライラガ — Kitanola uncula (Staudinger, 1887)
- クロマダライラガ — Mediocampa speciosa (Inoue, 1956)
- ナシイラガ — Narosoideus flavidorsalis (Staudinger, 1887)
- オキナワナシイラガ — Narosoideus ochridorsalis Inoue, 1982
- ヒメクロイラガ — Scopelodes contracta Walker, 1855
- イラガ — Monema flavescens Walker, 1855
- カギバイラガ — Heterogenea asella ([Denis & Schiffermüller], 1775)
- テングイラガ — Microleon longipalpis Butler, 1885
- アカイラガ — Phrixolepia sericea Butler, 1877
- アマミアカイラガ — Phrixolepia tenebrosa Kawazoe & Ogata, [1963]
- オキナワイラガ — Matsumurides okinawanus (Matsumura, 1931)
- ムラサキイラガ — Austrapoda dentata (Oberthür, 1879)
- ウスムラサキイラガ — Austrapoda hepatica Inoue, 1987
- アオイラガ — Parasa consocia Walker, 1863
- ヒロヘリアオイラガ — Parasa lepida lepida (Cramer, 1777)
- クロシタアオイラガ — Parasa sinica Moore, 1877
- ウストビイラガ — Ceratonema sericeum (Butler, 1881)
- ウスグロイラガ — Susica nasuta Inoue, 1986
- タイワンイラガ — Phlossa conjuncta (Walker, 1855)
- クロスジイラガ — Natada takemurai Inoue, 1986
- ベニイラガ — Demonarosa rufotessellata (Moore, 1879)
  - Demonarosa rufotessellata issiki (Kawazoe & Ogata, 1962)
- ヒロズイラガ — Naryciodes posticalis Matsumura, 1931
- マルモンイラガ — Trichogyia circulifera Hering, 1933
- ハスオビイラガ — Darna pallivitta (Moore, 1877)
- キンケウスバイラガ — Pseudopsyche endoxantha Püngeler, 1914
- トビスジイラガ — Isopenthocrates japona Yoshimoto, 2004

== Zygaenidae ==
- ウォンサンスカシクロバ — Illiberis assimilis Jordan, 1907
- ルリイロスカシクロバ — Illiberis consimilis Leech, 1898
- 和名未定 — Illiberis nigra (Leech, [1889])
- リンゴハマキクロバ — Illiberis pruni Dyar, 1905
- オオスカシクロバ — Illiberis psychina (Oberthür, 1880)
- ウメスカシクロバ — Illiberis rotundata Jordan, [1907]
- ブドウスカシクロバ — Illiberis tenuis (Butler, 1877)
- ホソバスカシクロバ — Illiberis yuennanensis Alberti, 1951
- キスジホソマダラ — Balataea gracilis gracilis (Walker, [1865])
- タマツジホソマダラ — Balataea kimurai Owada & Inaba, 2005
- ヤホシホソマダラ — Balataea octomaculata (Bremer, 1861)
- ヒメクロバ — Artona funeralis (Butler, 1879)
- タケノホソクロバ — Artona martini Efetov, 1997
- エサキマダラ — Clelea esakii Inoue, 1958
- ウスバクロマダラ — Inope heterogyna Staudinger, 1887
- ウスグロマダラ — Inope maerens Staudinger, 1887
- ヘリジロクロマダラ — Pseudoinope fusca (Leech, [1889])
- コガタクロマダラ — Inouela exiguitata (Inoue, 1978)
- ルリハダホソクロバ — Rhagades pruni esmeralda (Butler, 1877)
- オキナワルリチラシ久米島亜種 — Eterusia aedea azumai Owada, 2001
- オキナワルリチラシ徳之島亜種 — Eterusia aedea hamajii Owada, 2001
- オキナワルリチラシ中之島亜種 — Eterusia aedea masatakasatoi Owada, 2001
- オキナワルリチラシ屋久島種子島亜種 — Eterusia aedea micromaculata Inoue, 1982
- オキナワルリチラシ八重山亜種 — Eterusia aedea okinawana Matsumura, 1931
- オキナワルリチラシ沖縄本島亜種 — Eterusia aedea sakaguchii Matsumura, 1931
- オキナワルリチラシ本土亜種 — Eterusia aedea sugitanii Matsumura, 1927
- オキナワルリチラシ奄美亜種 — Eterusia aedea tomokunii Owada, 1989
- ツシマキモンチラシ — Eterusia watanabei Inoue, 1982
- サツマニシキ奄美・沖縄本島亜種 — Erasmia pulchella fritzei Jordan, 1908
- サツマニシキ屋久島種子島亜種 — Erasmia pulchella kumageana Inoue, 1976
- サツマニシキ本土亜種 — Erasmia pulchella nipponica Inoue, 1976
- サツマニシキ八重山亜種 — Erasmia pulchella sakishimana Inoue, 1976
- ホタルガ — Pidorus atratus Butler, 1877
- シロシタホタルガ — Neochalcosia remota (Walker, 1854)
- ルリモンホタルガ — Chalcosia auxo diana Butler, 1877
- メスジロホタルガ — Chalcosia formosana formosana Matsumura, 1911
- クロツバメ沖縄本島亜種 — Histia flabellicornis atrovirens Inoue, 1992
- クロツバメ八重山亜種 — Histia flabellicornis azurea Inoue, 1992
- クロツバメ奄美亜種 — Histia flabellicornis obsoleta Inoue, 1992
- ウスバツバメガ — Elcysma westwoodii westwoodii (Vollenhoven, 1863)
- ミノウスバ — Pryeria sinica Moore, 1877
- ベニモンマダラ北海道亜種 — Zygaena niphona hakodatensis Inoue, 1982
- ベニモンマダラ本州亜種 — Zygaena niphona niphona Butler, 1877

== Brachodidae ==
- ニシキヒロハマキモドキ — Nigilgia limata anactis Diakonoff, 1982
- ヤエヤマヒロハマキモドキ — Paranigilgia bushii (Arita, 1980)

== Sesiidae ==
- ムナブトヒメスカシバ — Trichocerota constricta (Butler, 1878)
- エサキヒメスカシバ — Trichocerota esakii (Yano, 1960)
- ヤクシマヒメスカシバ — Trichocerota yakushimaensis Arita, 1993
- シラホシヒメスカシバ — Paranthrenopsis editha (Butler, 1878)
- セスジスカシバ北海道亜種 — Pennisetia fixseni admirabilis Arita, 1992
- セスジスカシバ本州以南亜種 — Pennisetia fixseni fixseni (Leech, [1889])
- ヒメセスジスカシバ — Pennisetia hylaeiformis assimilis Arita, 1992
- ミナミセスジスカシバ — Pennisetia insulicola Arita, 1992
- コシボソスカシバ — Milisipepsis takizawai (Arita & Špatenka, 1989)
- オキナワスカシバ — Scasiba okinawana (Matsumura, 1931)
- カシワスカシバ — Scasiba rhynchioides (Butler, 1881)
- コシアカスカシバ — Scasiba scribai (Bartel, 1912)
- キタスカシバ — Sesia yezoensis (Hampson, 1919)
- タイワンモモブトスカシバ — Melittia formosana Matsumura, 1911
- シタキモモブトスカシバ — Melittia inouei Arita & Yata, 1987
- ルリオオモモブトスカシバ — Melittia nagaii Arita & Gorbunov, 1997
- オオモモブトスカシバ本土亜種 — Melittia sangaica nipponica Arita & Yata, 1987
- オオモモブトスカシバ八重山亜種 — Melittia sangaica sangaica Moore, 1877
- モモブトスカシバ — Macroscelesia japona (Hampson, 1919)
- アシナガモモブトスカシバ — Macroscelesia longipes yamatoensis Arita, 1992
- キクビスカシバ — Nokona feralis (Leech, [1889])
- ヒメアトスカシバ — Nokona pernix (Leech, [1889])
- ムラサキスカシバ — Nokona purpurea (Yano, 1965)
- ブドウスカシバ — Nokona regalis (Butler, 1878)
- アカスカシバ — Nokona rubra Arita & Tosevski, 1992
- ビロードスカシバ — Paranthrene tabaniformis tabaniformis (Rottemburg, 1775)
- ハチマガイスカシバ — Toleria contaminata (Butler, 1878)
- クビアカスカシバ — Toleria romanovi (Leech, [1889])
- キコスカシバ — Synanthedon esperi Špatenka & Arita, 1992
- アカオビコスカシバ — Synanthedon formicaeformis (Esper, 1783)
- フクズミコスカシバ — Synanthedon fukuzumii Špatenka & Arita, 1992
- コスカシバ — Synanthedon hector (Butler, 1878)
- ヒトスジコスカシバ — Synanthedon multitarsus Špatenka & Arita, 1992
- フタスジコスカシバ — Synanthedon pseudoscoliaeformis Špatenka & Arita, 1992
- カシコスカシバ — Synanthedon quercus (Matsumura, 1911)
- フトモンコスカシバ — Synanthedon scoliaeformis japonica Špatenka & Arita, 1992
- ヤマコスカシバ — Synanthedon subproducta Inoue, 1982
- ヒメコスカシバ — Synanthedon tenuis (Butler, 1878)
- スグリコスカシバ — Synanthedon tipuliformis (Clerck, 1759)
- キオビコスカシバ — Synanthedon unocingulata Bartel, 1912
- ヤノコスカシバ — Synanthedon yanoi Špatenka & Arita, 1992
- ミスジコスカシバ — Scalarignathia montis (Leech, [1889])

== Cossidae ==
- オオボクトウ — Cossus cossus orientalis Gaede, 1929
- ヒメボクトウ — Cossus insularis (Staudinger, 1892)
- ボクトウガ — Cossus jezoensis (Matsumura, 1931)
- クロシオゴマフボクトウ — Zeuzera caudata rhabdota Jordan, 1932
- コーヒーゴマフボクトウ — Zeuzera coffeae Nietner, 1861
- ゴマフボクトウ — Zeuzera multistrigata leuconota Butler, 1881
- ハイイロボクトウ — Phragmataecia castaneae (Hübner, 1790)

== Tortricidae ==
- ヒロバビロードハマキ — Eurydoxa advena Filipjev, 1930
- ニセビロードハマキ — Cerace onustana Walker, 1863
- ビロードハマキ — Cerace xanthocosma Diakonoff, 1950
- ウストビハマキ — Pandemis chlorograpta Meyrick, 1931
- アカトビハマキ — Pandemis cinnamomeana (Treitschke, 1830)
- ウスアミメトビハマキ — Pandemis corylana (Fabricius, 1794)
- スジトビハマキ — Pandemis dumetana (Treitschke, 1835)
- トビハマキ — Pandemis heparana ([Denis & Schiffermüller], 1775)
- オビグロハマキ — Pandemis ignescana (Kuznetzov, 1976)
- ヤマトビハマキ — Pandemis monticolana Yasuda, 1975
- クロタテスジハマキ — Archips abiephaga (Yasuda, 1975)
- アトキハマキ — Archips audax Razowski, 1977
- コアトキハマキ — Archips betulana betulana (Hübner, [1787])
- リンゴモンハマキ — Archips breviplicana Walsingham, 1900
- カタカケハマキ — Archips capsigerana (Kennel, 1901)
- クロカクモンハマキ — Archips endoi Yasuda, 1975
- イチイオオハマキ — Archips fumosa Kodama, 1960
- ミダレカクモンハマキ — Archips fuscocupreana Walsingham, 1900
- オオアトキハマキ — Archips ingentana (Christoph, 1881)
- チビカクモンハマキ — Archips insulana (Kawabe, 1965)
- モミアトキハマキ — Archips issikii Kodama, 1960
- リュウキュウアトキハマキ — Archips meridionalis Yasuda & Kawabe, 1980
- シリグロハマキ — Archips nigricaudana (Walsingham, 1900)
- マツアトキハマキ — Archips oporana (Linnaeus, 1758)
- クロシオハマキ — Archips peratrata Yasuda, 1961
- タテスジハマキ — Archips pulchra (Butler, 1879)
- ウスアトキハマキ — Archips semistructa (Meyrick, 1937)
- ナガレボシハマキ — Archips stellata Jinbo, 2006
- ヒナタハマキ — Archips subrufana (Snellen, 1883)
- ムラサキカクモンハマキ — Archips viola Falkovitsh, 1965
- カクモンハマキ — Archips xylosteana (Linnaeus, 1758)
- リンゴオオハマキ — Choristoneura adumbratana (Walsingham, 1900)
- コスジオビハマキ — Choristoneura diversana (Hübner, [1817])
- モミコスジオビハマキ — Choristoneura jezoensis Yasuda & Suzuki, 1987
- ウスキカクモンハマキ — Choristoneura lafauryana (Ragonot, 1875)
- アトボシハマキ — Choristoneura longicellana (Walsingham, 1900)
- スギハマキ — Homona issikii Yasuda, 1962
- チャハマキ — Homona magnanima Diakonoff, 1948
- ハイトビスジハマキ — Syndemis musculana nipponensis Yasuda, 1975
- ミヤマヒロバハマキ — Aphelia christophi Obraztsov, 1968
- カゲハマキ — Aphelia inumbratana (Christoph, 1881)
- 和名未定 — Aphelia paleana (Hübner, 1793)
- リシリハマキ — Aphelia septentrionalis Obraztsov, 1959
- 和名未定 — Aphelia viburnana ([Denis & Schiffermüller], 1775)
- トウヒオオハマキ — Lozotaenia coniferana (Issiki, 1961)
- コスギハマキ — Lozotaenia forsterana (Fabricius, 1781)
- タカネハマキ — Lozotaenia kumatai Oku, 1963
- カラマツイトヒキハマキ — Ptycholomoides aeriferana (Herrich-Schäffer, 1851)
- アミメキハマキ — Ptycholoma imitator (Walsingham, 1900)
- オオギンスジハマキ — Ptycholoma lecheanum circumclusanum (Christoph, 1881)
- カバスジハマキ — Tosirips perpulchranus ceramus Razowski, 1987
- ミヤマキハマキ — Clepsis aliana Kawabe, 1965
- ダイセツチビハマキ — Clepsis insignata Oku, 1963
- タカネベニハマキ — Clepsis jinboi Kawabe, 1965
- タカネハイイロハマキ — Clepsis monticolana Kawabe, 1964
- アカスジキイロハマキ — Clepsis pallidana (Fabricius, 1776)
- ウスモンハマキ — Clepsis rurinana (Linnaeus, 1758)
- ウスコカクモンハマキ — Adoxophyes dubia Yasuda, 1998
- チャノコカクモンハマキ — Adoxophyes honmai Yasuda, 1988
- リンゴコカクモンハマキ — Adoxophyes orana fasciata Walsingham, 1900
- オオハイジロハマキ — Pseudeulia asinana (Hübner, [1799])
- ハイジロハマキ — Pseudeulia vermicularis (Meyrick, 1935)
- ツヅリモンハマキ — Homonopsis foederatana (Kennel, 1901)
- ツヤスジハマキ — Homonopsis illotana (Kennel, 1901)
- オクハマキ — Dentisociaria armata okui Yasuda, 1975
- アセビコハマキ — Daemilus fulvus (Filipjev, 1962)
- ムツウラハマキ — Daemilus mutuurai Yasuda, 1975
- リュウキュウハマキ — Neocalyptis affinisana (Walker, 1863)
- コホソスジハマキ — Neocalyptis angustilineata (Walsingham, 1900)
- トビモンコハマキ — Neocalyptis congruentana (Kennel, 1901)
- ウストビモンハマキ — Neocalyptis lacernata (Yasuda, 1975)
- フタモンコハマキ — Neocalyptis liratana (Christoph, 1881)
- ニセトビモンコハマキ — Neocalyptis nigricana (Yasuda, 1975)
- ハイイロウスモンハマキ — Capua vulgana (Frölich, 1828)
- ミヤマオビハマキ — Geogepa monticola Jinbo, 2004
- ホシオビハマキ — Geogepa stenochorda (Diakonoff, 1948)
- リュウキュウトビモンハマキ — Gnorismoneura exulis Issiki & Stringer, 1932
- ホシノハマキ — Gnorismoneura hoshinoi (Kawabe, 1964)
- トビモンハマキ — Gnorismoneura mesotoma (Yasuda, 1975)
- ケバネハマキ — Gnorismoneura vallifica (Meyrick, 1935)
- クシヒゲムラサキハマキ — Terricula violetana (Kawabe, 1964)
- コギンボシハマキ — Drachmobola periastra Meyrick, 1907
- マダラギンスジハマキ — Pseudargyrotoza conwagana aeratana (Kennel, 1910)
- アオスジキハマキ — Dicanticinta diticinctana (Walsingham, 1900)
- ニセヒロバキハマキ — Minutargyrotoza calvicaput (Walsingham, 1900)
- ヒロバキハマキ — Minutargyrotoza minuta (Walsingham, 1900)
- 和名未定 — Protopterna eremia Yasuda & Razowski, 1991
- 和名未定 — Eulia dryonephela Meyrick, 1932
- ボカシハマキ — Eulia ministrana (Linnaeus, 1758)
- ホソバハイイロハマキ — Cnephasia stephensiana stolidana (Walker, 1863)
- ギンムジハマキ — Eana argentana (Clerck, 1759)
- キタハイイロハマキ — Eana incanana (Stephens, 1852)
- ヨモギゴマフハマキ — Eana vetulana (Christoph, 1881)
- ウスオビハイイロフユハマキ — Kawabeia ignavana (Christoph, 1881)
- ウスグロフユハマキ — Kawabeia nigricolor Yasuda & Kawabe, 1980
- ハイイロフユハマキ — Kawabeia razowskii (Kawabe, 1963)
- ヤチダモハマキ — Doloploca praeviella Erschoff, 1877
- モミヨコスジハマキ — Paracroesia abievora (Issiki, 1961)
- ギンボシトビハマキ — Spatalistis christophana (Walsingham, 1900)
- ギンスジクロハマキ — Spatalistis egesta Razowski, 1974
- スジマルバハマキ — Paratorna catenulella (Christoph, 1882)
- ミスジマルバハマキ — Paratorna cuprescens Falkovitsh, 1965
- ホノホハマキ — Acleris aestuosa Yasuda, 1965
- プライヤハマキ — Acleris affinatana (Snellen, 1883)
- ニセヤナギハマキ — Acleris albiscapulana (Christoph, 1881)
- ハンノキミダレモンハマキ — Acleris alnivora Oku, 1956
- オオウスアオハマキ — Acleris amurensis (Caradja, 1928)
- チャモンギンハマキ — Acleris arcuata (Yasuda, 1975)
- ギンスジカバハマキ — Acleris askoldana (Christoph, 1881)
- ウンモンキハマキ — Acleris aurichalcana (Bremer, 1865)
- マエアカハマキ — Acleris bicolor Kawabe, 1963
- ツマグロギンハマキ — Acleris blanda (Yasuda, 1975)
- キボシエグリハマキ — Acleris caerulescens (Walsingham, 1900)
- バラモンハマキ — Acleris comariana (Lienig & Zeller, 1846)
- ネウスハマキ — Acleris conchyloides (Walsingham, 1900)
- シロウマハマキ — Acleris crassa Razowski & Yasuda, 1964
- クロトラフハマキ — Acleris crataegi (Kuznetzov, 1964)
- トサカハマキ — Acleris cristana ([Denis & Schiffermüller], 1775)
- シロオビギンハマキ — Acleris dealbata (Yasuda, 1975)
- ギンミスジハマキ — Acleris delicata (Yasuda & Kawabe, 1980)
- コトサカハマキ — Acleris delicatana (Christoph, 1881)
- ニセウンモンキハマキ — Acleris dentata (Razowski, 1966)
- ホシギンスジキハマキ — Acleris elegans Oku, 1956
- エグリハマキ — Acleris emargana emargana (Fabricius, 1775)
- セウスイロハマキ — Acleris enitescens (Meyrick, 1912)
- モンウスイロハマキ — Acleris expressa (Filipjev, 1931)
- ウツギアミメハマキ — Acleris exsucana (Kennel, 1901)
- コウスアオハマキ — Acleris filipjevi Obraztsov, 1956
- モトキハマキ — Acleris fuscotogata (Walsingham, 1900)
- チャオビハマキ — Acleris hastiana (Linnaeus, 1758)
- ハイミダレモンハマキ — Acleris hispidana (Christoph, 1881)
- キタハマキ — Acleris hokkaidana Razowski & Yasuda, 1964
- ホソマダラハイイロハマキ — Acleris indignana (Christoph, 1881)
- スジエグリハマキ — Acleris issikii Oku, 1957
- ナカジロハマキ — Acleris japonica (Walsingham, 1900)
- コダマハマキ — Acleris kodamai Yasuda, 1965
- マエモンシロハマキ — Acleris lacordairana (Duponchel, 1836)
- ヤナギハマキ — Acleris laterana (Fabricius, 1794)
- ギンヨスジハマキ — Acleris leechi (Walsingham, 1900)
- ウスジロハマキ — Acleris logiana (Clerck, 1759)
- ゴマフテングハマキ — Acleris longipalpana (Snellen, 1883)
- ナカタニハマキ — Acleris maccana (Treitschke, 1835)
- スジグロハマキ — Acleris nigrilineana Kawabe, 1963
- ネグロハマキ — Acleris nigriradix (Filipjev, 1931)
- コガシラハマキ — Acleris ophthalmicana Razowski & Yasuda, 1964
- ツマモンエグリハマキ — Acleris paradiseana (Walsingham, 1900)
- ナラコハマキ — Acleris perfundana Kuznetzov, 1962
- ウスギンスジキハマキ — Acleris phalera (Kuznetzov, 1964)
- アカネハマキ — Acleris phantastica Razowski & Yasuda, 1964
- チャモンシロハマキ — Acleris placata (Meyrick, 1912)
- ウスモンオオハマキ — Acleris placida Yasuda & Kawabe, 1980
- フタスジクリイロハマキ — Acleris platynotana (Walsingham, 1900)
- マエキハマキ — Acleris pulchella Kawabe, 1964
- ニセウスギンスジキハマキ — Acleris razowskii (Yasuda, 1975)
- ゴマフミダレハマキ — Acleris rufana ([Denis & Schiffermüller], 1775)
- シロオビハマキ — Acleris salicicola Kuznetzov, 1970
- コアミメチャハマキ — Acleris shepherdana (Stephens, 1852)
- ウスモンハイイロハマキ — Acleris similis (Filipjev, 1931)
- ウスアオハマキ — Acleris strigifera (Filipjev, 1931)
- ミヤマミダレモンハマキ — Acleris submaccana (Filipjev, 1962)
- ヒメサザナミハマキ — Acleris takeuchii Razowski & Yasuda, 1964
- トラフハマキ — Acleris tigricolor (Walsingham, 1900)
- クロコハマキ — Acleris tunicatana (Walsingham, 1900)
- ニレハマキ — Acleris ulmicola (Meyrick, 1930)
- ヒカゲハマキ — Acleris umbrana (Hübner, [1799])
- ウスオビチャイロハマキ — Acleris uniformis (Filipjev, 1931)
- ヨコヒダハマキ — Acleris yasudai Razowski, 1966
- 和名未定 — Tortrix punctana Motschulsky, 1866
- 和名未定 — Tortrix rubicana Motschulsky, 1866
- ウスアミメキハマキ — Tortrix sinapina (Butler, 1879)
- アミメテングハマキ — Sparganothis illustris Razowski, 1975
- カキノテングハマキ — Sparganothis matsudai Yasuda, 1975
- テングハマキ — Sparganothis pilleriana ([Denis & Schiffermüller], 1775)
- フタテンホソハマキ — Phtheochroa inopiana (Haworth, [1811])
- 和名未定 — Phtheochroa issikii (Razowski, 1977)
- セジロホソハマキ — Phtheochroa pistrinana (Erschoff, 1877)
- オオムナグロホソハマキ — Phtheochroa pulvillana (Herrich-Schäffer, 1851)
- オオウンモンホソハマキ — Phtheochroa vulneratana (Zetterstedt, 1840)
- ホソバホソハマキ — Cochylimorpha amabilis (Meyrick, 1931)
- クサビホソハマキ — Cochylimorpha jaculana (Snellen, 1883)
- ウスキホソハマキ — Cochylimorpha nipponana (Razowski, 1977)
- ウスモンコホソハマキ — Gynnidomorpha alismana (Ragonot, 1883)
- 和名未定 — Gynnidomorpha luridana (Gregson, 1870)
- ミニホソハマキ — Gynnidomorpha minimana (Caradja, 1916)
- チビホソハマキ — Gynnidomorpha permixtana ([Denis & Schiffermüller], 1775)
- リンドウホソハマキ — Gynnidomorpha rubricana (Peyerimhoff, 1877)
- コホソハマキ — Gynnidomorpha vectisana (Humphreys & Westwood, 1845)
- ミダレモンホソハマキ — Phalonidia aliena Kuznetzov, 1966
- アミメホソハマキ — Phalonidia chlorolitha (Meyrick, 1931)
- ニセフトオビホソハマキ — Phalonidia curvistrigana (Stainton, 1859)
- コホソオビホソハマキ — Phalonidia lydiae (Filipjev, 1940)
- コナカオビホソハマキ — Phalonidia manniana (Fischer von Röslerstamm, 1839)
- コエダオビホソハマキ — Phalonidia melanothica (Meyrick, 1927)
- クワイホソハマキ — Phalonidia mesotypa Razowski, 1970
- クロミニホソハマキ — Phalonidia parvana Kawabe, 1980
- フトオビホソハマキ — Phalonidia latifasciana Razowski, 1970
- ツマオビシロホソハマキ — Phalonidia zygota Razowski, 1964
- ツマオビホソハマキ — Phtheochroides apicana (Walsingham, 1900)
- ヨモギオオホソハマキ — Phtheochroides clandestina Razowski, 1968
- ギンモンホソハマキ — Eugnosta dives (Butler, 1878)
- ツマオビセンモンホソハマキ — Eugnosta ussuriana (Caradja, 1926)
- ニセエダオビホソハマキ — Aethes cnicana cnicana (Westwood, 1854)
- ダイセツホソハマキ — Aethes deutschiana (Zetterstedt, 1840)
- チャモンキホソハマキ — Aethes hoenei Razowski, 1964
- フタスジキホソハマキ — Aethes rectilineana (Caradja, 1939)
- エダオビホソハマキ — Aethes rubigana (Treitschke, 1830)
- ミヤマコホソハマキ — Aethes rutilana rutilana (Hübner, [1817])
- 和名未定 — Aethes smeathmanniana (Fabricius, 1781)
- ツマギンスジナガバホソハマキ — Aethes triangulana excellentana (Christoph, 1881)
- ブドウホソハマキ — Eupoecilia ambiguella (Hübner, [1796])
- ツマオビキホソハマキ — Eupoecilia angustana (Hübner, [1799])
- フタオビホソハマキ — Eupoecilia citrinana Razowski, 1960
- イノウエホソハマキ — Eupoecilia inouei Kawabe, 1972
- アカオビホソハマキ — Eupoecilia kobeana Razowski, 1968
- フトハスジホソハマキ — Cochylidia contumescens (Meyrick, 1931)
- ハスジチビホソハマキ — Cochylidia heydeniana (Herrich-Schäffer, 1851)
- ヨモギウストビホソハマキ — Cochylidia richteriana (Fischer von Röslerstamm, 1837)
- ナカハスジベニホソハマキ — Cochylidia subroseana (Haworth, [1811])
- トガリホソハマキ — Cochylis hybridella (Hübner, [1810-1813])
- ネグロホソハマキ — Cochylis nana (Haworth, [1811])
- ハラブトヒメハマキ — Cryptaspasma angulicostana (Walsingham, 1900)
- ヘリオビヒメハマキ — Cryptaspasma marginifasciata (Walsingham, 1900)
- クロサンカクモンヒメハマキ — Cryptaspasma trigonana (Walsingham, 1900)
- キモントガリバヒメハマキ — Bactra cerata cerata (Meyrick, 1909)
- 和名未定 — Bactra copidotis Meyrick, 1909
- トガリバヒメハマキ — Bactra festa Diakonoff, 1959
- イグサヒメハマキ — Bactra furfurana (Haworth, [1811])
- フタモントガリバヒメハマキ — Bactra hostilis Diakonoff, 1956
- 和名未定 — Bactra lacteana Caradja, 1916
- ウキヤガラシンムシガ — Bactra robustana (Christoph, 1872)
- シロテントガリバヒメハマキ — Bactra venosana (Zeller, 1847)
- ギンボシクロヒメハマキ — Hiroshiinoueana stellifera Kawabe, 1978
- シロテンアカマダラヒメハマキ — Gatesclarkeana idia Diakonoff, 1973
- サッポロヒメハマキ — Ukamenia sapporensis (Matsumura, 1931)
- オオクロマダラヒメハマキ — Endothenia atrata (Caradja, 1926)
- ウンモンクロマダラヒメハマキ — Endothenia austerana (Kennel, 1916)
- ニセコクロヒメハマキ — Endothenia bira Kawabe, 1976
- 和名未定 — Endothenia ericetana (Humphreys & Westwood, 1845)
- ツマジロクロヒメハマキ — Endothenia gentianaeana (Hübner, [1799])
- キヨサトヒメハマキ — Endothenia habesana (Walker, 1863)
- カワラクロマダラヒメハマキ — Endothenia informalis (Meyrick, 1935)
- ホソクロマダラヒメハマキ — Endothenia ingrata Falkovitsh, 1970
- ハッカノネムシガ — Endothenia menthivora (Oku, [1963])
- クロマダラシンムシガ — Endothenia nigricostana (Haworth, [1811])
- ニセハッカノネムシガ — Endothenia quadrimaculana (Haworth, [1811])
- コクロヒメハマキ — Endothenia remigera Falkovitsh, 1970
- ヤクサザナミキヒメハマキ — Tokuana imbrica Kawabe, 1978
- ミナミヒメハマキ — Rhodocosmaria occidentalis Diakonoff, 1973
- ヘリグロヒメハマキ — Orientophiaris altissima (Kawabe, 1978)
- タブノヒメハマキ — Sorolopha plinthograpta (Meyrick, 1931)
- ハスオビヒメハマキ — Sorolopha sphaerocopa (Meyrick, 1930)
- ツマモンヒメハマキ — Eudemopsis kirishimensis Kawabe, 1974
- マエジロムラサキヒメハマキ — Eudemopsis pompholycias (Meyrick, 1935)
- ツマモンベニヒメハマキ — Eudemopsis purpurissatana (Kennel, 1901)
- コツマモンベニヒメハマキ — Eudemopsis tokui Kawabe, 1974
- ニセツマモンベニヒメハマキ — Eudemopsis toshimai Kawabe, 1974
- ツママルモンヒメハマキ — Eudemis brevisetosa Oku, 2005
- ヤマモモヒメハマキ — Eudemis gyrotis (Meyrick, 1900)
- ナカグロマルモンヒメハマキ — Eudemis lucida Liu & Bai, 1982
- サクラマルモンヒメハマキ — Eudemis porphyrana (Hübner, [1799])
- 和名未定 — Phaecasiophora attica (Meyrick, 1907)
- オオシロアシヒメハマキ — Phaecasiophora fernaldana Walsingham, 1900
- シロテンシロアシヒメハマキ — Phaecasiophora obraztsovi Diakonoff, 1973
- ツマベニヒメハマキ — Phaecasiophora roseana (Walsingham, 1900)
- コモンアシブトヒメハマキ — Psilacantha pryeri (Walsingham, 1900)
- スジオビヒメハマキ — Dactylioglypha tonica (Meyrick, 1909)
- シロモンアカヒメハマキ — Statherotoxys hedraea (Meyrick, 1905)
- オジロモンヒメハマキ — Cephalophyes cyanura (Meyrick, 1909)
- レイシヒメハマキ — Statherotis discana (Felder & Rogenhofer, 1875)
- オオヒロオビヒメハマキ — Statherotis towadaensis Kawabe, 1978
- オガタマヒメハマキ — Arcesis threnodes (Meyrick, 1905)
- コブシヒメハマキ — Neostatherotis nipponica Oku, 1974
- ヒロバクロヒメハマキ — Proschistis marmaropa (Meyrick, 1907)
- シモフリヒメハマキ — Rhodacra pyrrhocrossa (Meyrick, 1912)
- キモンヒメハマキ — Statherotmantis pictana (Kuznetzov, 1969)
- コシロモンヒメハマキ — Statherotmantis shicotana (Kuznetzov, 1969)
- ツシマツマキヒメハマキ — Aterpia bicolor Kawabe, 1978
- 和名未定 — Aterpia chalybeia Falkovitsh, 1966
- サカモンヒメハマキ — Aterpia circumfluxana (Christoph, 1881)
- オカトラノオヒメハマキ — Aterpia flavipunctana (Christoph, 1881)
- イッシキヒメハマキ — Aterpia issikii Kawabe, 1980
- ナカジロヒメハマキ — Aterpia praeceps (Meyrick, 1909)
- ネジロクロヒメハマキ — Aterpia semnodryas (Meyrick, 1936)
- 和名未定 — Neopotamia divisa (Walsingham, 1900)
- 和名未定 — Neopotamia ochracea (Walsingham, 1900)
- ミダレモンヒメハマキ — Phaecadophora acutana Walsingham, 1900
- スネブトヒメハマキ — Phaecadophora fimbriata Walsingham, 1900
- モザイクヒメハマキ — Temnolopha mosaica (Lower, 1901)
- ヤナギサザナミヒメハマキ — Saliciphaga acharis (Butler, 1879)
- オオヤナギサザナミヒメハマキ — Saliciphaga caesia Falkovitsh, 1962
- ドロヒメハマキ — Pseudosciaphila branderiana (Linnaeus, 1758)
- オオセンダンヒメハマキ — Dudua aprobola (Meyrick, 1886)
- カンコヒメハマキ — Dudua charadraea (Meyrick, 1909)
- ホソウンモンヒメハマキ — Dudua hemigrapta (Meyrick, 1931)
- 和名未定 — Dudua scaeaspis (Meyrick, 1937)
- コシロアシヒメハマキ — Hystrichoscelus spathanum Walsingham, 1900
- タテスジヒメハマキ — Hedya anaplecta (Meyrick, 1909)
- グミオオウスツマヒメハマキ — Hedya auricristana (Walsingham, 1900)
- ヤマボウシヒメハマキ — Hedya corni Oku, 1974
- 和名未定 — Hedya designata (Kuznetzov, 1970)
- シロモンヒメハマキ — Hedya dimidiana (Clerck, 1759)
- カンコノスジヒメハマキ — Hedya gratiana Kawabe, 1974
- ニセシロモンヒメハマキ — Hedya ignara Falkovitsh, 1962
- オオサザナミヒメハマキ — Hedya inornata (Walsingham, 1900)
- カタシロムラサキヒメハマキ — Hedya iophaea (Meyrick, 1912)
- シベチャツマジロヒメハマキ — Hedya ochroleucana (Frölich, 1828)
- 和名未定 — Hedya salicella (Linnaeus, 1758)
- オオウスヅマヒメハマキ — Hedya semiassana (Kennel, 1901)
- ナガウスツマヒメハマキ — Hedya simulans Oku, 2005
- ツシマクロヒメハマキ — Hedya tsushimaensis Kawabe, 1978
- シラフオオヒメハマキ — Hedya vicinana (Ragonot, 1894)
- バラギンオビヒメハマキ — Hedya walsinghami Oku, 1974
- ツマキオオヒメハマキ — Pseudohedya cincinna Falkovitsh, 1962
- ハイナミスジキヒメハマキ — Pseudohedya dentata Oku, 2005
- ナカオビナミスジキヒメハマキ — Pseudohedya gradana (Christoph, 1881)
- ニセギンボシモトキヒメハマキ — Pseudohedya plumbosana (Kawabe, 1972)
- オオナミスジキヒメハマキ — Pseudohedya retracta Falkovitsh, 1962
- サトウヒメハマキ — Pseudohedya satoi Kawabe, 1978
- ガレモンヒメハマキ — Zeiraphera argutana (Christoph, 1881)
- セギンモンヒメハマキ — Zeiraphera bicolora Kawabe, 1976
- クロモンミズアオヒメハマキ — Zeiraphera caeruleumana Kawabe, 1980
- ハシドイヒメハマキ — Zeiraphera corpulentana (Kennel, 1901)
- シロマルモンヒメハマキ — Zeiraphera demutata (Walsingham, 1900)
- ニセミドリヒメハマキ — Zeiraphera fulvomixtana Kawabe, 1974
- ハイイロアミメヒメハマキ — Zeiraphera griseana (Hübner, [1799])
- ヒロシヒメハマキ — Zeiraphera hiroshii Kawabe, 1980
- カラマツチャイロヒメハマキ — Zeiraphera lariciana Kawabe, 1980
- アサヒヒメハマキ — Zeiraphera luciferana Kawabe, 1980
- 和名未定 — Zeiraphera ratzeburgiana (Saxesen, 1840)
- トドマツアミメヒメハマキ — Zeiraphera rufimitrana truncata Oku, 1968
- マエジロミドリモンヒメハマキ — Zeiraphera shimekii Kawabe, 1974
- ミドリモンヒメハマキ — Zeiraphera subcorticana (Snellen, 1883)
- コエゾマツアミメヒメハマキ — Zeiraphera suzukii Oku, 1968
- ミドリヒメハマキ — Zeiraphera virinea Falkovitsh, 1965
- クロテンツマキヒメハマキ — Metendothenia atropunctana (Zetterstedt, 1839)
- ニセクロテンツマキヒメハマキ — Metendothenia inouei Kawabe, 1987
- ツゲモドキヒメハマキ — Metendothenia mesarotra (Meyrick, 1911)
- オガサワラヒメハマキ — Metendothenia ogasawarensis Kawabe & Kusui, 1978
- ネホシウスツマヒメハマキ — Apotomis basipunctana (Walsingham, 1900)
- ツマジロヒメハマキ — Apotomis betuletana (Haworth, [1811])
- チャオビヒメハマキ — Apotomis biemina Kawabe, 1980
- ヤナギツマジロヒメハマキ — Apotomis capreana (Hübner, [1817])
- チャモンヒメハマキ — Apotomis cuphostra (Butler, 1879)
- キオビヒメハマキ — Apotomis flavifasciana (Kawabe, 1976)
- グミツマジロヒメハマキ — Apotomis geminata (Walsingham, 1900)
- ナカグロツマジロヒメハマキ — Apotomis jucundana Kawabe, 1984
- カワベタカネヒメハマキ — Apotomis kusunokii Kawabe, 1993
- グミウスツマヒメハマキ — Apotomis lacteifascies (Walsingham, 1900)
- エゾツマジロヒメハマキ — Apotomis lineana ([Denis & Schiffermüller], 1775)
- ニセネジロクロヒメハマキ — Apotomis platycremna (Meyrick, 1935)
- スノキツマジロヒメハマキ — Apotomis vaccinii Kuznetzov, 1969
- キタツマジロヒメハマキ — Apotomis vigens Falkovitsh, 1966
- トウヒヒメハマキ — Cymolomia hartigiana (Saxesen, 1840)
- イソツツジノメムシガ — Argyroploce lediana (Linnaeus, 1758)
- コシモフリヒメハマキ — Selenodes concretana (Wocke, 1862)
- 和名未定 — Olethreutes acropryeranus (Bae, 2000)
- シモツケチャイロヒメハマキ — Olethreutes avianus (Falkovitsh, 1959)
- シロマダラヒメハマキ — Olethreutes bipunctanus yama (Kawabe, 1974)
- ツヤスジウンモンヒメハマキ — Olethreutes cacuminanus (Kennel, 1901)
- モンギンスジヒメハマキ — Olethreutes captiosanus (Falkovitsh, 1960)
- クリイロヒメハマキ — Olethreutes castaneanus (Walsingham, 1900)
- スギゴケヒメハマキ — Olethreutes dissolutanus (Stange, 1886)
- ウスクリモンヒメハマキ — Olethreutes dolosanus (Kennel, 1901)
- クローバヒメハマキ — Olethreutes doubledayanus (Barret, 1872)
- ウツギヒメハマキ — Olethreutes electanus (Kennel, 1901)
- オオツヤスジウンモンヒメハマキ — Olethreutes examinatus (Falkovitsh, 1966)
- マダラチビヒメハマキ — Olethreutes exilis Falkovitsh, 1966
- アミメヒメハマキ — Olethreutes fasciatanus (Clemens, 1860)
- ガンコウランヒメハマキ — Olethreutes hokkaidanus (Bae, 2000)
- キオビキマダラヒメハマキ — Olethreutes humeralis (Walsingham, 1900)
- イヌエンジュヒメハマキ — Olethreutes ineptanus (Kennel, 1901)
- マノヒメハマキ — Olethreutes manoi (Kawabe, 1987)
- ホソギンスジヒメハマキ — Olethreutes metallicanus bicornutanus (Kuznetzov, 1971)
- 和名未定 — Olethreutes milichopis (Meyrick, 1931)
- ナツハゼヒメハマキ — Olethreutes moderatus (Falkovitsh, 1962)
- クワヒメハマキ — Olethreutes mori (Matsumura, 1900)
- コクワヒメハマキ — Olethreutes morivorus (Matsumura, 1900)
- クリオビキヒメハマキ — Olethreutes obovatus (Walsingham, 1900)
- カゲマダラヒメハマキ — Olethreutes opacalis (Bae, 2000)
- コクリオビクロヒメハマキ — Olethreutes orthocosma (Meyrick, 1931)
- キスジオビヒメハマキ — Olethreutes pryeranus (Walsingham, 1900)
- タカネナガバヒメハマキ — Olethreutes schulzianus (Fabricius, 1777)
- ウワミズヒメハマキ — Olethreutes semicremanus (Christoph, 1881)
- ギンボシモトキヒメハマキ — Olethreutes sideranus (Treitschke, 1835)
- ナミスジキヒメハマキ — Olethreutes subretractus (Kawabe, 1976)
- コモンギンスジヒメハマキ — Olethreutes subtilanus (Falkovitsh, 1959)
- トドマツハイモンヒメハマキ — Olethreutes tephreus (Falkovitsh, 1966)
- ミヤマキマダラヒメハマキ — Olethreutes toshiookui (Bae, 2000)
- オオクリモンヒメハマキ — Olethreutes transversanus (Christoph, 1881)
- ツタキオビヒメハマキ — Olethreutes tsutavorus (Oku, 1971)
- ウシタキキオビヒメハマキ — Phiaris komaii Bae, 2005
- 和名未定 — Rudisociaria expeditana (Snellen, 1883)
- クリオビクロヒメハマキ — Rudisociaria velutina (Walsingham, 1900)
- ミヤマウンモンヒメハマキ — Syricoris lacunana ([Denis & Schiffermüller], 1775)
- コケキオビヒメハマキ — Celypha aurofasciana (Haworth, [1811])
- ウスクリイロヒメハマキ — Celypha cespitana (Hübner, [1817])
- コウスクリイロヒメハマキ — Celypha cornigera Oku, 1968
- コキスジオビヒメハマキ — Celypha flavipalpana (Herrich-Schäffer, 1851)
- ゴトウヅルヒメハマキ — Celypha hydrangeana (Kuznetzov, 1969)
- 和名未定 — Celypha kurilensis Oku, 1965
- ニセウツギヒメハマキ — Celypha subelectana (Kawabe, 1976)
- キツリフネヒメハマキ — Pristerognatha fuligana ([Denis & Schiffermüller], 1775)
- キシタヒメハマキ — Pristerognatha penthinana (Guenée, 1845)
- アミメモンヒメハマキ — Pseudohermenias abietana (Fabricius, 1787)
- ホソオビアミメモンヒメハマキ — Pseudohermenias ajaensis Falkovitsh, 1966
- アカマツハナムシガ — Piniphila bifasciana (Haworth, [1811])
- ミヤマツヤスジウンモンヒメハマキ — Orthotaenia secunda Falkovitsh, 1962
- イラクサヒメハマキ — Orthotaenia undulana ([Denis & Schiffermüller], 1775)
- 和名未定 — Capricornia boisduvaliana (Duponchel, 1836)
- アカマダラヒメハマキ — Ophiorrhabda tokui (Kawabe, 1974)
- ホソバチビヒメハマキ — Lobesia aeolopa Meyrick, 1907
- ネギホソバヒメハマキ — Lobesia bicinctana bicinctana (Duponchel, 1842)
- 和名未定 — Lobesia candida Diakonoff, 1973
- スイカズラホソバヒメハマキ — Lobesia coccophaga Falkovitsh, 1970
- 和名未定 — Lobesia crimea Falkovitsh, 1970
- トドマツチビヒメハマキ — Lobesia incystata Liu & Yang, 1987
- 和名未定 — Lobesia macroptera Liu & Bae, 1994
- ミエヒメハマキ — Lobesia mieae Kawabe, 1980
- 和名未定 — Lobesia pyriformis Bae & Park, 1992
- ホソバヒメハマキ — Lobesia reliquana (Hübner, [1776])
- 和名未定 — Lobesia takahiroi Bae, 1996
- カラマツホソバヒメハマキ — Lobesia virulenta virulenta Bae & Komai, 1991
- ハマナスホソバヒメハマキ — Lobesia yasudai Bae & Komai, 1991
- チャモンサザナミキヒメハマキ — Neoanathamna cerina Kawabe, 1978
- スジキヒメハマキ — Neoanathamna negligens Kawabe, 1978
- ニセコシワヒメハマキ — Neoanathamna nipponica (Kawabe, 1976)
- スソモンサザナミキヒメハマキ — Neoanathamna pallens Kawabe, 1980
- コナミスジキヒメハマキ — Tetramoera flammeata (Kuznetzov, 1971)
- カンシャシンクイ — Tetramoera schistaceana (Snellen, 1891)
- ハイマダラヒメハマキ — Sillybiphora devia Kuznetzov, 1964
- マゲバヒメハマキ — Kennelia xylinana (Kennel, 1900)
- マエモンマダラカギバヒメハマキ — Ancylis amplimacula Falkovitsh, 1965
- タテスジカギバヒメハマキ — Ancylis apicella ([Denis & Schiffermüller], 1775)
- ツマアカカギバヒメハマキ — Ancylis apicipicta Oku, 2005
- アキニレカギバヒメハマキ — Ancylis arcitenens Meyrick, 1922
- セクロモンカギバヒメハマキ — Ancylis badiana ([Denis & Schiffermüller], 1775)
- 和名未定 — Ancylis caudifer Stringer, 1929
- イチゴカギバヒメハマキ — Ancylis comptana (Frölich, 1828)
- 和名未定 — Ancylis corylicolana Kuznetzov, 1962
- ナミモンカギバヒメハマキ — Ancylis geminana (Donovan, 1806)
- チャモンカギバヒメハマキ — Ancylis kenneli Kuznetzov, 1962
- マダラカギバヒメハマキ — Ancylis laetana (Fabricius, 1775)
- オオセモンカギバヒメハマキ — Ancylis limosa Oku, 2005
- コカギバヒメハマキ — Ancylis lotkini Kuznetzov, 1969
- セモンカギバヒメハマキ — Ancylis mandarinana Walsingham, 1900
- クロテンマダラカギバヒメハマキ — Ancylis melanostigma Kuznetzov, 1970
- ミヤマカギバヒメハマキ — Ancylis myrtilana myrtilana (Treitschke, 1830)
- カギバヒメハマキ — Ancylis nemorana Kuznetzov, 1969
- ウススジアカカギバヒメハマキ — Ancylis obtusana (Haworth, [1811])
- カバカギバヒメハマキ — Ancylis partitana (Christoph, 1881)
- ナガカギバヒメハマキ — Ancylis repandana Kennel, 1901
- ナツメカギバヒメハマキ — Ancylis sativa Liu, 1979
- フタボシヒメハマキ — Ancylis selenana (Guenée, 1845)
- ウスベニカギバヒメハマキ — Ancylis uncella ([Denis & Schiffermüller], 1775)
- ウスキカギバヒメハマキ — Ancylis unculana (Haworth, [1811])
- ニシベツヒメハマキ — Ancylis unguicella (Linnaeus, 1758)
- コゲチャカギバヒメハマキ — Ancylis upupana (Treitschke, 1835)
- イチイヒメハマキ — Coenobiodes abietiella (Matsumura, 1931)
- ロッコウヒメハマキ — Coenobiodes acceptana Kuznetzov, 1973
- ヒノキカワモグリガ — Coenobiodes granitalis (Butler, 1881)
- コギンボシキヒメハマキ — Enarmonia decor Kawabe, 1978
- 和名未定 — Enarmonia infausta Walsingham, 1900
- ギンボシキヒメハマキ — Enarmonia major (Walsingham, 1900)
- エゾギンボシヒメハマキ — Enarmonia minuscula Kuznetzov, 1981
- クロキマダラヒメハマキ — Enarmonodes aeologlypta (Meyrick, 1936)
- アイノキマダラヒメハマキ — Enarmonodes aino Kuznetzov, 1968
- 和名未定 — Enarmonodes kunashirica Kuznetzov, 1969
- 和名未定 — Enarmonodes recreantana (Kennel, 1900)
- ニセハギカギバヒメハマキ — Semnostola magnifisa (Kuznetzov, 1964)
- セサンカクモンヒメハマキ — Semnostola triangulata Nasu & Kogi, 1997
- ツマアカクロヒメハマキ — Semnostola trisignifera Kuznetzov, 1970
- ムルティヒメハマキ — Eucosmomorpha multicolor Kuznetzov, 1964
- ブナヒメハマキ — Rhopalovalva amabilis Oku, 1974
- ギンヅマヒメハマキ — Rhopalovalva exartemana (Kennel, 1901)
- サザナミキヒメハマキ — Rhopalovalva lascivana (Christoph, 1881)
- モリウチヒメハマキ — Rhopalovalva moriutii Oku, 2005
- キカギヒメハマキ — Rhopalovalva pulchra (Butler, 1879)
- トガリバシロヒメハマキ — Acroclita catharotorna Meyrick, 1935
- グミハイジロヒメハマキ — Acroclita elaeagnivora Oku, 1979
- グミシロテンヒメハマキ — Acroclita gumicola Oku, 1979
- マダラスキバヒメハマキ — Peridaedala algosa (Meyrick, 1912)
- チビマダラヒメハマキ — Peridaedala optabilana (Kuznetzov, 1979)
- イチゴツツヒメハマキ — Pseudacroclita hapalaspis (Meyrick, 1931)
- クリミドリシンクイガ — Fibuloides aestuosa (Meyrick, 1912)
- コモトグロヒメハマキ — Fibuloides cyanopsis (Meyrick, 1912)
- モトゲヒメハマキ — Fibuloides japonica (Kawabe, 1978)
- レイシウスバヒメハマキ — Fibuloides nigrovenana (Kuznetzov, 1988)
- モッコクヒメハマキ — Eucoenogenes ancyrota (Meyrick, 1907)
- キイロヒメハマキ — Eucoenogenes teliferana (Christoph, 1881)
- ニセシロヒメシンクイ — Spilonota albicana (Motschulsky, 1866)
- イスノキヒメハマキ — Spilonota distyliana Moriuti, 1958
- カラマツヒメハマキ — Spilonota eremitana Moriuti, 1972
- 和名未定 — Spilonota laricana (Heinemann, 1863)
- リンゴハイイロヒメハマキ — Spilonota lechriaspis Meyrick, 1932
- クロゲハイイロヒメハマキ — Spilonota melanocopa (Meyrick, 1912)
- リンゴシロヒメハマキ — Spilonota ocellana ([Denis & Schiffermüller], 1775)
- ハシバミシロヒメハマキ — Spilonota prognathana (Snellen, 1883)
- モトアカヒメハマキ — Spilonota semirufana (Christoph, 1881)
- ドクウツギツノエグリヒメハマキ — Strepsicrates coriariae coriariae Oku, 1979
- バンジロウツノエグリヒメハマキ — Strepsicrates semicanella (Walker, 1866)
- ニセウスキシロヒメハマキ — Gibberifera hepaticana Kawabe & Nasu, 1994
- ウスキシロヒメハマキ — Gibberifera simplana (Fischer von Röslerstamm, 1836)
- アカトドマツヒメハマキ — Epinotia aciculana Falkovitsh, 1965
- ヒカゲヒメハマキ — Epinotia albiguttata (Oku, 1974)
- クロツヅリヒメハマキ — Epinotia aquila Kuznetzov, 1968
- タマヒメハマキ — Epinotia autonoma Falkovitsh, 1965
- ツチイロヒメハマキ — Epinotia autumnalis Oku, 2005
- ヒロオビヒメハマキ — Epinotia bicolor (Walsingham, 1900)
- ダケカンバヒメハマキ — Epinotia brunnichana (Linnaeus, 1767)
- ムモンツチイロヒメハマキ — Epinotia bushiensis Kawabe, 1980
- トウヒハイイロヒメハマキ — Epinotia cineracea Nasu, 1991
- ニセヤナギメムシガ — Epinotia cinereana (Haworth, [1811])
- ミツシロモンヒメハマキ — Epinotia contrariana (Christoph, 1881)
- アカバヒメハマキ — Epinotia coryli Kuznetzov, 1970
- ミヤマヤナギヒメハマキ — Epinotia cruciana (Linnaeus, 1761)
- ニセイツカドモンヒメハマキ — Epinotia demarniana (Fischer von Röslerstamm, 1839)
- エゾハイイロヒメハマキ — Epinotia densiuncaria Kuznetzov, 1985
- クロマダラシロヒメハマキ — Epinotia exquisitana (Christoph, 1881)
- オオナガバヒメハマキ — Epinotia maculana (Fabricius, 1775)
- ハナウドモグリガ — Epinotia majorana (Caradja, 1916)
- 和名未定 — Epinotia mercuriana (Frölich, 1828)
- ヤナギメムシガ — Epinotia nisella (Clerck, 1759)
- 和名未定 — Epinotia notoceliana Kuznetzov, 1985
- イツカドモンヒメハマキ — Epinotia pentagonana (Kennel, 1901)
- トウヒツヅリヒメハマキ千島亜種 — Epinotia piceae brevivalva Kuznetzov, 1968
- トウヒツヅリヒメハマキ日本本土亜種 — Epinotia piceae piceae (Issiki, 1961)
- トウヒシロスジヒメハマキ — Epinotia piceicola Kuznetzov, 1970
- ハイマツコヒメハマキ — Epinotia pinicola Kuznetzov, 1969
- クシヒゲヒメハマキ — Epinotia pygmaeana (Hübner, [1799])
- カギモンヒメハマキ — Epinotia ramella (Linnaeus, 1785)
- セクロモンヒメハマキ — Epinotia rasdolnyana (Christoph, 1881)
- マツヒメハマキ — Epinotia rubiginosana koraiensis Falkovitsh, 1965
- ムモンハンノメムシガ — Epinotia rubricana Kuznetzov, 1968
- セシロモンヒメハマキ — Epinotia salicicolana Kuznetzov, 1968
- ニレマダラヒメハマキ — Epinotia signatana (Douglas, 1845)
- セウスモンヒメハマキ — Epinotia solandriana (Linnaeus, 1758)
- 和名未定 — Epinotia subocellana (Donovan, 1806)
- ニセクシヒゲヒメハマキ — Epinotia subsequana (Haworth, [1811])
- ハンノメムシガ — Epinotia tenerana ussurica Kuznetzov, 1968
- カンバウスモンヒメハマキ — Epinotia tetraquetrana (Haworth, [1811])
- フタシロモンヒメハマキ — Epinotia trigonella (Linnaeus, 1758)
- ツルギクシヒゲヒメハマキ — Epinotia tsurugisana Oku, 2005
- ニレチャイロヒメハマキ — Epinotia ulmi Kuznetzov, 1966
- ニレコヒメハマキ — Epinotia ulmicola Kuznetzov, 1966
- アトフタモンヒメハマキ — Phaneta bimaculata (Kuznetzov, 1966)
- ウスツヤハイイロヒメハマキ — Gypsonoma attrita Falkovitsh, 1965
- コヤナギヒメハマキ — Gypsonoma bifasciata Kuznetzov, 1966
- ネグロヒメハマキ — Gypsonoma dealbana (Frölich, 1828)
- ウスネグロヒメハマキ — Gypsonoma ephoropa (Meyrick, 1931)
- アカムラサキヒメハマキ — Gypsonoma erubesca Kawabe, 1978
- ヒラノヒメハマキ — Gypsonoma hiranoi Kawabe, 1980
- ムモンハイイロヒメハマキ — Gypsonoma holocrypta (Meyrick, 1931)
- ムジシロチャヒメハマキ — Gypsonoma kawabei Nasu & Kusunoki, 1998
- ウスモンハイイロヒメハマキ — Gypsonoma maritima Kuznetzov, 1970
- ポプラヒメハマキ — Gypsonoma minutana (Hübner, [1799])
- ナカオビウスツヤヒメハマキ — Gypsonoma nitidulana (Lienig & Zeller, 1846)
- タテヤマヒメハマキ — Gypsonoma oppressana (Treitschke, 1835)
- ヒロオビネグロヒメハマキ — Gypsonoma rivulata Oku, 2005
- カオジロネグロヒメハマキ — Gypsonoma sociana (Haworth, [1811])
- マツトビマダラシンムシガ — Gravitarmata margarotana (Heinemann, 1863)
- マツアカシンムシ — Rhyacionia dativa Heinrich, 1928
- ニセマツアカヒメハマキ — Rhyacionia pinivorana (Lienig & Zeller, 1846)
- マツツマアカシンムシ — Rhyacionia simulata Heinrich, 1928
- アトシロモンヒメハマキ — Rhyacionia vernalis Nasu & Kawahara, 2004
- ワシヤシントメヒメハマキ — Rhyacionia washiyai Kono & Sawamoto, 1940
- マツアカツヤシンムシ — Retinia coeruleostriana (Caradja, 1939)
- マツズアカシンムシ — Retinia cristata (Walsingham, 1900)
- 和名未定 — Retinia immanitana (Kuznetzov, 1969)
- カラマツカサガ — Retinia impropria (Meyrick, 1932)
- エゾズアカヒメハマキ — Retinia jezoensis Nasu, 1991
- ツマクロテンヒメハマキ — Retinia monopunctata (Oku, 1968)
- 和名未定 — Retinia resinella (Linnaeus, 1758)
- コツマキクロヒメハマキ — Hendecaneura apicipicta Walsingham, 1900
- ツマキクロヒメハマキ — Hendecaneura cervina Walsingham, 1900
- オオツマキクロヒメハマキ — Hendecaneura impar Walsingham, 1900
- ツツジヒメシンクイ — Hendecaneura rhododendrophaga Nasu & Komai, 1997
- ウスシロモンヒメハマキ — Notocelia autolitha (Meyrick, 1931)
- エゾシロヒメハマキ — Notocelia incarnatana (Hübner, [1796-1799])
- ニセバラシロヒメハマキ — Notocelia nimia Falkovitsh, 1965
- ハマナスヒメハマキ — Notocelia plumbea Nasu, 1980
- バラシロヒメハマキ — Notocelia rosaecolana (Doubleday, 1850)
- ヤクシマヒメハマキ — Notocelia yakushimensis Kawabe, 1974
- 和名未定 — Epiblema ermolenkoi Kuznetzov, 1968
- シロモンチャヒメハマキ — Epiblema expressanum (Christoph, 1881)
- ヨモギネムシガ — Epiblema foenellum (Linnaeus, 1758)
- クロウンモンヒメハマキ — Epiblema inconspicum (Walsingham, 1900)
- ニセシロモンクロヒメハマキ — Epiblema macrorris Walsingham, 1900
- プライヤヒメハマキ — Epiblema pryeranum (Walsingham, 1900)
- ギンスジアカチャヒメハマキ千島亜種 — Epiblema quinquefascianum kurilensis Kuznetzov, 1968
- ギンスジアカチャヒメハマキ日本本土亜種 — Epiblema quinquefascianum quinquefascianum (Matsumura, 1900)
- ウンモンサザナミヒメハマキ — Epiblema rimosanum (Christoph, 1881)
- スギヒメハマキ — Epiblema sugii Kawabe, 1976
- スソクロモンヒメハマキ — Eucosma abacana (Erschoff, 1877)
- シロズスソモンヒメハマキ — Eucosma aemulana (Schläger, 1848)
- ミヤマスソモンヒメハマキ — Eucosma aspidiscana (Hübner, [1817])
- クロモンシロヒメハマキ — Eucosma brachysticta Meyrick, 1935
- 和名未定 — Eucosma caliacrana (Caradja, 1931)
- ニセモンシロスソモンヒメハマキ — Eucosma campoliliana ([Denis & Schiffermüller], 1775)
- アザミスソモンヒメハマキ — Eucosma cana (Haworth, [1811])
- ソトジロトガリヒメハマキ — Eucosma catharaspis (Meyrick, 1922)
- スソモンハイイロヒメハマキ — Eucosma certana Kuznetzov, 1967
- キガシラスソモンヒメハマキ — Eucosma confunda Kuznetzov, 1966
- オヒルギヒメハマキ — Eucosma coniogramma Clarke, 1976
- オオコゲチャスソモンヒメハマキ — Eucosma denigratana (Kennel, 1901)
- オオハイスソモンヒメハマキ — Eucosma discernata Kuznetzov, 1966
- カバイロスソモンヒメハマキ — Eucosma glebana (Snellen, 1883)
- ホソバウンモンヒメハマキ — Eucosma hohenwartiana ([Denis & Schiffermüller], 1775)
- ホソバシロヒメハマキ — Eucosma lacteata (Treitschke, 1835)
- トビモンシロヒメハマキ — Eucosma metzneriana (Treitschke, 1830)
- モンシロスソモンヒメハマキ — Eucosma niveicaput (Walsingham, 1900)
- マエグロスソモンヒメハマキ — Eucosma obumbratana (Lienig & Zeller, 1846)
- スソクロモンアカチャヒメハマキ — Eucosma ommatoptera kurilensis Falkovitsh, 1968
- オオカバスソモンヒメハマキ — Eucosma rigidana (Snellen, 1883)
- 和名未定 — Eucosma scutiformis Meyrick, 1931
- コカバスソモンヒメハマキ — Eucosma striatiradix Kuznetzov, 1964
- コシワヒメハマキ — Eucosma striatulana Walsingham, 1900
- トビモンヒメハマキ — Eucosma tundrana (Kennel, 1900)
- ウスチャスソモンヒメハマキ — Eucosma wimmerana (Treitschke, 1835)
- コゲチャスソモンヒメハマキ — Eucosma yasudai Nasu, 1982
- キガシラアカネヒメハマキ — Lepteucosma huebneriana (Koçak, 1980)
- キベリヒメハマキ — Lepteucosma shikokuensis (Kawabe, 1984)
- コスキバヒメハマキ — Melanodaedala melanoneura (Meyrick, 1912)
- チャイロヒメハマキ — Epibactra usuiana Kawabe, 1976
- ウスマダラヒメハマキ — Pelochrista decolorana (Freyer, [1840])
- オオウスシロモンヒメハマキ — Pelochrista mollitana (Zeller, 1847)
- コウンモンヒメハマキ — Pelochrista notocelioides Oku, 1972
- フタオビチャヒメハマキ — Pelochrista umbraculana (Eversmann, 1844)
- ドアイウンモンヒメハマキ — Eriopsela kostjuki (Kuznetzov, 1973)
- ダイセツヒメハマキ — Eriopsela quadrana (Hübner, [1813])
- 和名未定 — Thiodia citrana (Hübner, [1796-1799])
- ノギクメムシガ — Thiodia dahurica (Falkovitsh, 1965)
- シロスジヒロバヒメハマキ — Thiodia torridana (Lederer, 1859)
- 和名未定 — Rhopobota bicolor Kawabe, 1989
- マダラカマヒメハマキ — Rhopobota falcata Nasu, 1999
- ハリギリミドリヒメハマキ — Rhopobota grypodes (Meyrick, 1912)
- オオセシロヒメハマキ — Rhopobota ilexi Kuznetzov, 1969
- ヤマツツジマダラヒメハマキ — Rhopobota kaempferiana (Oku, 1971)
- アケビヒメハマキ — Rhopobota latipennis (Walsingham, 1900)
- モチツツジマダラヒメハマキ — Rhopobota macrosepalana (Oku, 1971)
- クロネハイイロヒメハマキ — Rhopobota naevana (Hübner, [1814-1817])
- ソヨゴチビヒメハマキ — Rhopobota okui Nasu, 2000
- シロオビマダラヒメハマキ — Rhopobota relicta (Kuznetzov, 1968)
- チャオビマダラヒメハマキ — Rhopobota shikokuensis (Oku, 1971)
- シロズマダラヒメハマキ — Rhopobota toshimai (Kawabe, 1978)
- セシロヒメハマキ — Rhopobota ustomaculana (Curtis, 1831)
- ハマゴウヒメシンクイ — Noduliferola abstrusa Kuznetzov, 1973
- アオイヒメハマキ — Crocidosema plebejana Zeller, 1847
- マキヒメハマキ — Makivora hagiyai Oku, 1979
- フクギモグリヒメハマキ — Heleanna fukugi Nasu, 1999
- ウスズミクロモンヒメハマキ — Heleanna tokyoensis Nasu, 2007
- ショウベンノキヒメハマキ — Heleanna turpinivora Nasu & Byun, 2007
- 和名未定 — Pseudococcyx turionella (Linnaeus, 1758)
- マダラコケイロヒメハマキ — Herpystis tinctoria Meyrick, 1916
- ツマキハイイロヒメハマキ — Antichlidas holocnista Meyrick, 1931
- センダンヒメハマキ — Loboschiza koenigiana (Fabricius, 1775)
- ミナミキオビヒメハマキ — Demeijerella catharota (Meyrick, 1928)
- シロスジヘリホシヒメハマキ — Dichrorampha albistriana Komai, 1979
- ヘリホシヒメハマキ — Dichrorampha cancellatana Kennel, 1901
- ハイヘリホシヒメハマキ — Dichrorampha canimaculana Komai, 1979
- ムモンヘリホシヒメハマキ — Dichrorampha impuncta Komai, 1979
- アカムラサキヘリホシヒメハマキ — Dichrorampha interponana (Danilevsky, 1960)
- キオビヘリホシヒメハマキ — Dichrorampha latiflavana Caradja, 1916
- オクヘリホシヒメハマキ — Dichrorampha okui Komai, 1979
- ホソキオビヘリホシヒメハマキ — Dichrorampha petiverella (Linnaeus, 1758)
- ウスキヘリホシヒメハマキ — Dichrorampha testacea Komai, 1979
- コキオビヘリホシヒメハマキ — Dichrorampha vancouverana McDunnough, 1935
- シロテンボカシヒメハマキ — Thaumatotibia hemitoma (Diakonoff, 1976)
- メヒルギアシブトヒメハマキ — Cryptophlebia amamiana Komai & Nasu, 2003
- コアシブトヒメハマキ — Cryptophlebia distorta (Hampson, 1905)
- オヒルギアシブトヒメハマキ — Cryptophlebia horii Kawabe, 1987
- クロモンアシブトヒメハマキ — Cryptophlebia nota Kawabe, 1978
- アシブトヒメハマキ — Cryptophlebia ombrodelta (Lower, 1898)
- ヤエヤマヒルギアシブトヒメハマキ — Cryptophlebia palustris Komai & Nasu, 2003
- リュウキュウアシブトヒメハマキ — Cryptophlebia repletana (Walker, 1863)
- オオアシブトヒメハマキ — Cryptophlebia yasudai Kawabe, 1972
- アズキサヤムシガ — Matsumuraeses azukivora (Matsumura, 1910)
- タイツリオオギサヤヒメハマキ — Matsumuraeses capax Razowski & Yasuda, 1975
- ダイズサヤムシガ — Matsumuraeses falcana (Walsingham, 1900)
- マメヒメサヤムシガ — Matsumuraeses phaseoli (Matsumura, 1900)
- クズヒメサヤムシガ — Matsumuraeses ussuriensis (Caradja, 1916)
- ヒロバヒメサヤムシガ — Matsumuraeses vicina Kuznetzov, 1973
- ナナカマドヒメシンクイ — Grapholita andabatana (Wolff, 1957)
- サクラシンクイガ — Grapholita cerasivora (Matsumura, 1917)
- ヨツスジヒメシンクイ — Grapholita delineana (Walker, 1863)
- スモモヒメシンクイガ — Grapholita dimorpha Komai, 1979
- セシモフリヒメハマキ — Grapholita endrosias (Meyrick, 1907)
- 和名未定 — Grapholita exigua Kuznetzov, 1972
- シタジロヒメハマキ — Grapholita fimana Snellen, 1883
- スキバヒメハマキ — Grapholita hyalitis (Meyrick, 1909)
- リンゴコシンクイ — Grapholita inopinata (Heinrich, 1928)
- エゾシタジロヒメハマキ — Grapholita jesonica (Matsumura, 1931)
- 和名未定 — Grapholita kurilana Kuznetzov, 1976
- ミドリバエヒメハマキ — Grapholita latericia Komai, 1999
- ナシヒメシンクイ — Grapholita molesta (Busck, 1916)
- クロミドリバエヒメハマキ — Grapholita okui Komai, 1999
- フタスジヒメハマキ — Grapholita pallifrontana Lienig & Zeller, 1846
- 和名未定 — Grapholita pavonana (Walsingham, 1900)
- ハマナスヒメシンクイ — Grapholita rosana Danilevsky, 1968
- コスソキンモンヒメハマキ — Grapholita scintillana Christoph, 1881
- イバラヒメシンクイ — Grapholita tenebrosana Duponchel, 1843
- ヤブマメヒメシンクイ — Grapholita yasudai Komai, 1999
- 和名未定 — Pammene aceris Kuznetzov, 1968
- イバラムモンヒメハマキ — Pammene adusta Kuznetzov, 1972
- アイノセシロオビヒメハマキ — Pammene ainorum Kuznetzov, 1968
- フタキモンヒメハマキ — Pammene aurana (Fabricius, 1775)
- タカダツヤスジクロヒメハマキ — Pammene caeruleata Kuznetzov, 1970
- 和名未定 — Pammene exscribana Kuznetzov, 1986
- ニセセキオビヒメハマキ — Pammene flavicellula Kuznetzov, 1971
- セホソオビヒメハマキ — Pammene fulminea Komai, 1999
- トウキヒメハマキ — Pammene gallicana (Guenée, 1845)
- ホソバヒメシンクイ — Pammene germmana (Hübner, [1796-1799])
- 和名未定 — Pammene griseana Walsingham, 1900
- アトハイジロヒメハマキ — Pammene griseomaculana Kuznetzov, 1960
- ホソシタジロヒメハマキ — Pammene grunini (Kuznetzov, 1960)
- 和名未定 — Pammene ignorata Kuznetzov, 1968
- 和名未定 — Pammene insolentana Kuznetzov, 1964
- セキオビヒメハマキ — Pammene japonica Kuznetzov, 1968
- ネモロウサヒメハマキ — Pammene nemorosa Kuznetzov, 1968
- ウスグロヒメハマキ — Pammene obscurana (Stephens, 1834)
- コトドマツヒメハマキ — Pammene ochsenheimeriana (Lienig & Zeller, 1846)
- シタジロシロモンヒメハマキ — Pammene orientana Kuznetzov, 1960
- トウヒコハマキ — Pammene piceae Komai, 1999
- シコタンコハマキ — Pammene shicotanica Kuznetzov, 1968
- コツガノヒメハマキ — Pammene tsugae Issiki, 1961
- ブナヒメシンクイ — Pseudopammene fagivora Komai, 1980
- フトキオビヒメハマキ — Parapammene aurifascia Kuznetzov, 1981
- スジオビクロヒメハマキ — Parapammene dichroramphana (Kennel, 1900)
- コスジオビクロヒメハマキ — Parapammene glaucana (Kennel, 1901)
- コウススジヒメハマキ — Parapammene imitatrix Kuznetzov, 1986
- ウススジヒメハマキ — Parapammene inobservata Kuznetzov, 1962
- 和名未定 — Parapammene petulantana (Kennel, 1901)
- オリーブヒメハマキ — Parapammene reversa Komai, 1999
- コスジオビキヒメハマキ — Parapammene selectana (Christoph, 1881)
- 和名未定 — Strophedra magna Komai, 1999
- カシワギンオビヒメハマキ — Strophedra nitidana (Fabricius, 1794)
- 和名未定 — Strophedra quercivora (Meyrick, 1920)
- 和名未定 — Andrioplecta pulverula (Meyrick, 1912)
- マメシンクイガ — Leguminivora glycinivorella (Matsumura, 1898)
- クララシンクイガ — Fulcrifera orientis (Kuznetzov, 1966)
- カエデシンクイガ — Cydia acerivora (Danilevsky, 1968)
- シロツメモンヒメハマキ — Cydia amurensis (Danilevsky, 1968)
- スギカサヒメハマキ — Cydia cryptomeriae (Issiki, 1961)
- ヨツメヒメハマキ — Cydia danilevskyi (Kuznetzov, 1973)
- コヨツメヒメハマキ — Cydia ermolenkoi (Kuznetzov, 1968)
- 和名未定 — Cydia fagiglandana (Zeller, 1841)
- サンカクモンヒメハマキ — Cydia glandicolana (Danilevsky, 1968)
- シロスジカサガ — Cydia illutana dahuricolana (Kuznetzov, 1962)
- シタウスキヒメハマキ — Cydia indivisa (Danilevsky, 1963)
- シロアシヨツメモンヒメハマキ — Cydia japonensis Kawabe, 1980
- 和名未定 — Cydia kamijoi (Oku, 1968)
- クリミガ — Cydia kurokoi (Amsel, 1960)
- カラマツミキモグリガ — Cydia laricicolana (Kuznetzov, 1960)
- エダキオビヒメハマキ — Cydia leguminana (Lienig & Zeller, 1864)
- ミナミツマジロヒメハマキ — Cydia leucostoma (Meyrick, 1912)
- イヌエンジュサヤモグリガ — Cydia maackiana (Danilevsky, 1963)
- 和名未定 — Cydia malesana (Meyrick, 1920)
- エンドウシンクイ — Cydia nigricana (Fabricius, 1794)
- トドマツミキモグリガ — Cydia pactolana yasudai (Oku, 1968)
- ツヤツチイロシンクイ — Cydia prismatica (Meyrick, 1911)
- ニセエンジュヒメハマキ — Cydia secretana (Kuznetzov, 1973)
- ミヤマクロヒメハマキ — Cydia silvana (Kuznetzov, 1970)
- エゾマツカサガ — Cydia strobilella (Linnaeus, 1758)
- エンジュヒメハマキ — Cydia trasias (Meyrick, 1928)
- クロホシカラマツミキモグリガ — Cydia zebeana (Ratzeburg, 1840)
- クロモンカバマダラハマキ — Mictocommosis nigromaculata (Issiki, 1930)
- オオナミモンマダラハマキ — Charitographa mikadonis (Stringer, 1930)
- 和名未定 — Thaumatographa aurosa (Diakonoff & Arita, 1976)
- クロモンベニマダラハマキ — Thaumatographa decoris (Diakonoff & Arita, 1976)
- コクロモンベニマダラハマキ — Thaumatographa eremnotorna (Diakonoff & Arita, 1976)
- 和名未定 — Thaumatographa leucopyrga (Meyrick, 1912)
- 和名未定 — Thaumatographa machaerophora (Diakonoff & Arita, 1976)
- オガサワラマダラハマキ — Trymalitis escharia Clarke, 1976
- スジケマダラハマキ — Lopharcha psathyra Diakonoff, 1989
- Lopharcha kinokuniana Nasu, 2008
