= Acleris submaccana =

Scientific classification
- Domain: Eukaryota
- Kingdom: Animalia
- Phylum: Arthropoda
- Class: Insecta
- Order: Lepidoptera
- Family: Tortricidae
- Genus: Acleris
- Species: A. submaccana

Binomial name
- Acleris submaccana (Filipjev, 1962)

Synonyms
- Peronea submaccana Filipjev, 1962; Acleris simplex Razowski & Yasuda, 1964

Species of moth

Acleris submaccana is a species of moth of the family Tortricidae. It is found in South Korea, China, Taiwan, Japan, Russia and Central Asia.

The wingspan is about 22 mm. Adults are on wing in early August in China.

The larvae feed on Betula platyphylla, Alnus maximowiczii, Alnus japonica, Duchesnea indica, Salix koreensis, Rhododendron simsii, Ribes species, Vaccinium vitis-idaea and Viburnum dilatatum. Larvae can be found in mid-June.
