= Antichlidas trigonia =

Scientific classification
- Kingdom: Animalia
- Phylum: Arthropoda
- Class: Insecta
- Order: Lepidoptera
- Family: Tortricidae
- Genus: Antichlidas
- Species: A. trigonia

Binomial name
- Antichlidas trigonia Zhang & Li, 2004

Species of moth

Antichlidas trigonia is a species of moth in the family Tortricidae. It is found in China (Henan, Hubei).
