= Coenobiodes melanocosma =

Scientific classification
- Domain: Eukaryota
- Kingdom: Animalia
- Phylum: Arthropoda
- Class: Insecta
- Order: Lepidoptera
- Family: Tortricidae
- Genus: Coenobiodes
- Species: C. melanocosma

Binomial name
- Coenobiodes melanocosma (Turner, 1916)

Synonyms
- Eucosma melanocosma Turner, 1916

Species of moth

Coenobiodes melanocosma is a species of moth of the family Tortricidae. It is found in Australia, where it has been recorded from Queensland.

The wingspan is about 15 mm. The forewings are white with dark fuscous markings and with numerous costal strigulae (fine streaks). The hindwings are pale grey.
