= Antichlidas =

Scientific classification
- Kingdom: Animalia
- Phylum: Arthropoda
- Class: Insecta
- Order: Lepidoptera
- Family: Tortricidae
- Tribe: Eucosmini
- Genus: Antichlidas; Meyrick, 1931

Synonyms
- Antichlidias Bradley, 1957

Genus of tortrix moths

Antichlidas is a genus of moths belonging to the subfamily Olethreutinae of the family Tortricidae. The genus occurs in East Asia (China, Korea, Japan).

== Species ==
There are two recognized species:

- Antichlidas holocnista Meyrick, 1931
- Antichlidas trigonia Zhang & Li, 2004

== See also ==
- List of Tortricidae genera
