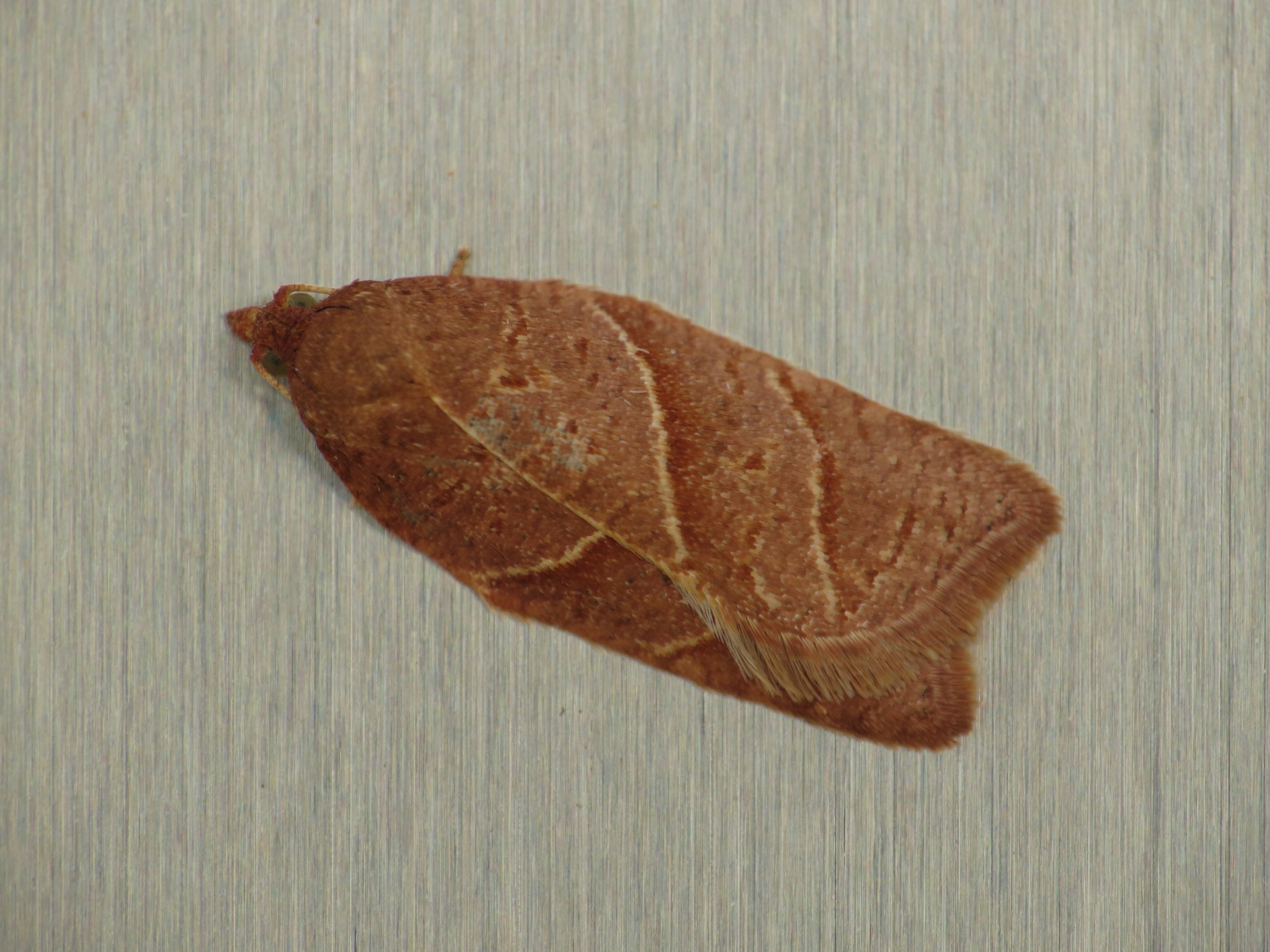
- Acleris platynotana Walsingham, 1900, Alpensia Convention Centre, Pyeongchang, South Korea, 8 October 2014

Scientific classification
- Domain: Eukaryota
- Kingdom: Animalia
- Phylum: Arthropoda
- Class: Insecta
- Order: Lepidoptera
- Family: Tortricidae
- Genus: Acleris
- Species: A. platynotana

Binomial name
- Acleris platynotana (Walsingham, 1900)

Synonyms
- Oxygrapha platynotana Walsingham, 1900; Peronea ocydroma Meyrick, in Caradja & Meyrick, 1935; Peronea oxydroma Caradja, 1939

= Acleris platynotana =

Species of moth

Acleris platynotana is a species of moth of the family Tortricidae. It is found in China, Japan (Hokkaido, Honshu) and the Russian Far East. The habitat consists of rhododendron groves and black birch-oak-pine forests.

The wingspan is 16–21 mm (0.63–0.83 in). Adults have been recorded on wing from May to June and again from August to October in Japan.

The larvae feed on Ilex pedunculosa, Lyonia ovalifolia, Rhododendron kaempferi, Rhododendron molle and Quercus glauca. They feed within the rolled leaves of their host plant. Larvae can be found in June. The species overwinters as an adult.
