= Acleris issikii =

Scientific classification
- Domain: Eukaryota
- Kingdom: Animalia
- Phylum: Arthropoda
- Class: Insecta
- Order: Lepidoptera
- Family: Tortricidae
- Genus: Acleris
- Species: A. issikii

Binomial name
- Acleris issikii Oku, 1957

Species of moth

Acleris issikii is a species of moth of the family Tortricidae. It is found in Korea, China, Japan and Russia (Amur, Ussuri, Vladivostok).

The wingspan is 16–21 mm. There are two generations per year with adults on wing from June to July and again from September to October.

The larvae feed on Salix integra, Populus nigra and Populus sieboldii.
