= Coenobiodes =

Scientific classification
- Domain: Eukaryota
- Kingdom: Animalia
- Phylum: Arthropoda
- Class: Insecta
- Order: Lepidoptera
- Family: Tortricidae
- Tribe: Endotheniini
- Genus: Coenobiodes; Kuznetzov, 1973

Genus of tortrix moths

Coenobiodes is a genus of moths belonging to the subfamily Olethreutinae of the family Tortricidae.

== Species ==
- Coenobiodes abietiella (Matsumura, 1931)
- Coenobiodes acceptana Kuznetzov, 1973
- Coenobiodes euryochra (Bradley, 1962)
- Coenobiodes granitalis (Butler, 1881)
- Coenobiodes melanocosma (Turner, 1916)

== See also ==
- List of Tortricidae genera
