= Acleris delicatana =

Scientific classification
- Domain: Eukaryota
- Kingdom: Animalia
- Phylum: Arthropoda
- Class: Insecta
- Order: Lepidoptera
- Family: Tortricidae
- Genus: Acleris
- Species: A. delicatana

Binomial name
- Acleris delicatana (Christoph, 1881)

Synonyms
- Teras delicatana Christoph, 1881

Species of moth

Acleris delicatana is a species of moth of the family Tortricidae. It is found in China, Japan and Russia (Siberia).

The wingspan is about 17 mm.

The larvae feed on Corylus sieboldiana var. mandshurica, Corylus heterophylla, Fraxinus manschuria, Betula platyphylla, Carpinus (including Carpinus japonica, Carpinus cordata, Carpinus manschurica) and Quercus species.
