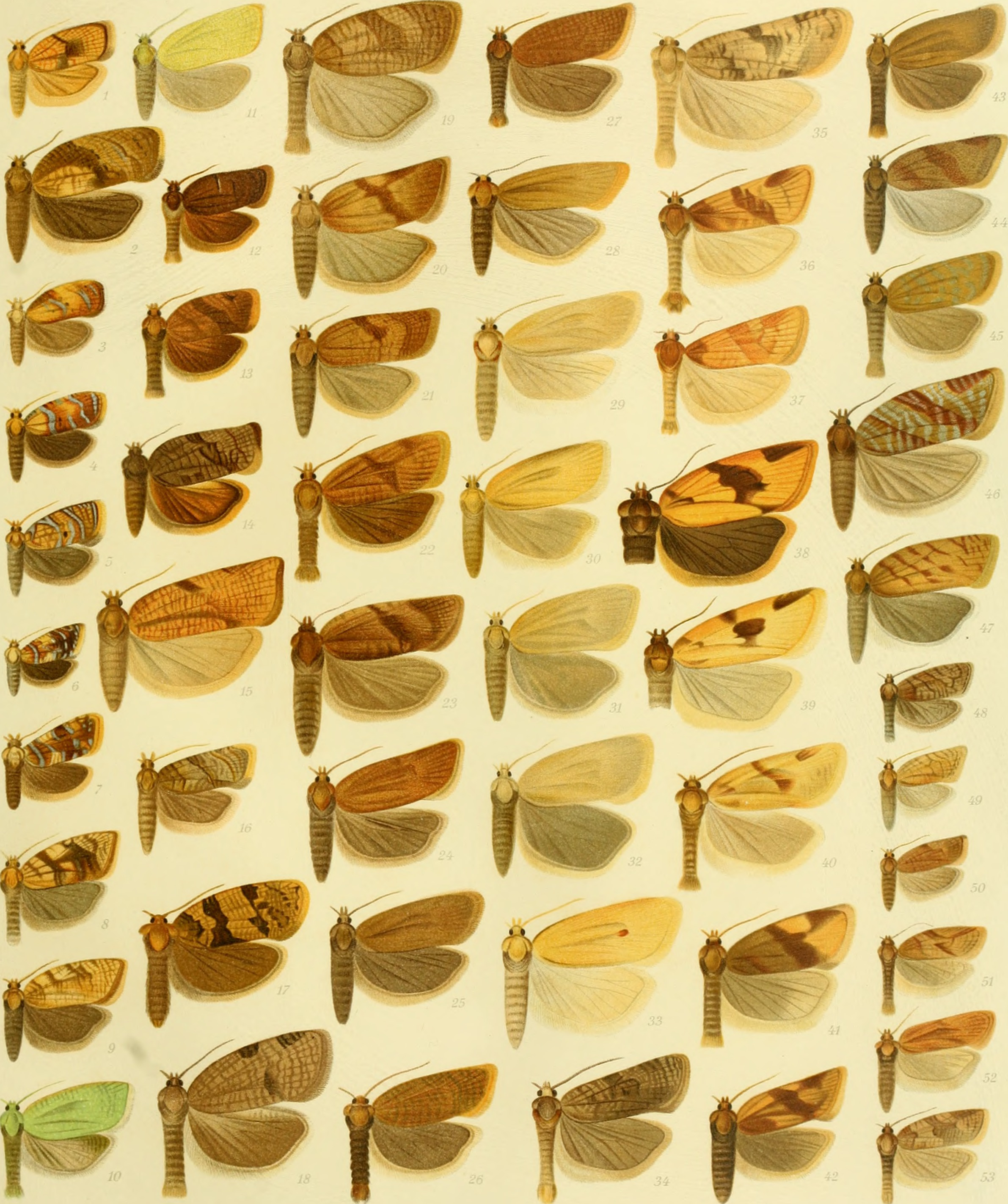
- Acleris conchyloides in Kennel Die palaearktischen tortriciden figure 16 female type

Scientific classification
- Kingdom: Animalia
- Phylum: Arthropoda
- Clade: Pancrustacea
- Class: Insecta
- Order: Lepidoptera
- Family: Tortricidae
- Genus: Acleris
- Species: A. conchyloides

Binomial name
- Acleris conchyloides (Walsingham, 1900)

Synonyms
- Tortrix conchyloides Walsingham, 1900; Croesia conchyloides; Tortrix arquatana Kennel, 1901

= Acleris conchyloides =

Species of moth

Acleris conchyloides is a species of moth of the family Tortricidae. It is found in the Russian Far East (Ussuri, the Kuriles) and Japan.

The wingspan is 16–19 mm.

The larvae feed on Quercus mongolica.
