= Acleris ulmicola =

Scientific classification
- Kingdom: Animalia
- Phylum: Arthropoda
- Class: Insecta
- Order: Lepidoptera
- Family: Tortricidae
- Genus: Acleris
- Species: A. ulmicola

Binomial name
- Acleris ulmicola (Meyrick, 1930)

Synonyms
- Peronea ulmicola Meyrick, 1930

Species of moth

Acleris ulmicola is a species of moth of the family Tortricidae. It is found in South Korea, China, Japan, Taiwan and Russia (Amur Oblast).

The wingspan is 13–16 mm. There are two seasonal forms. The summer generation is white, while the autumn generation is grey.

The larvae feed on Ulmus davidiana and Ulmus propinqua.
