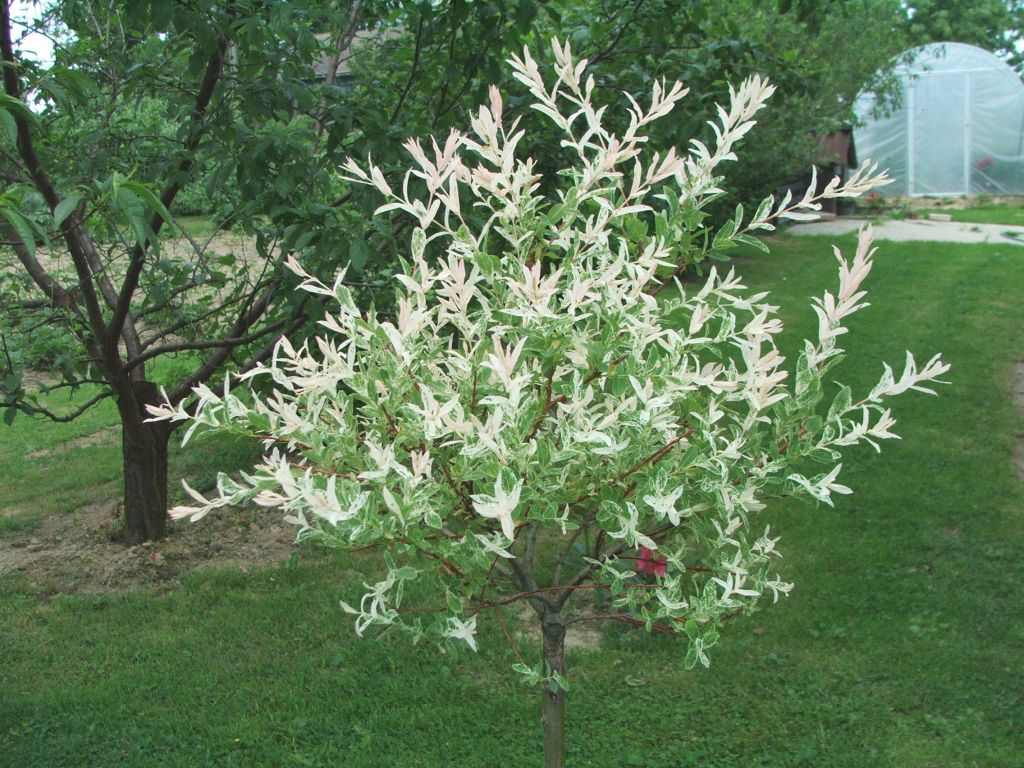

Scientific classification
- Kingdom: Plantae
- Clade: Tracheophytes
- Clade: Angiosperms
- Clade: Eudicots
- Clade: Rosids
- Order: Malpighiales
- Family: Salicaceae
- Genus: Salix
- Species: S. integra

Binomial name
- Salix integra Thunb.

= Salix integra =

Species of willow

Salix integra is a species of willow native to northeastern China, Japan, Korea and the far southeastern Russia (Primorsky Krai).

It is a deciduous shrub growing to 2–6 m tall with greyish-green bark and reddish to yellowish shoots. The leaves are 2–10 cm long and 1–2 cm wide; they are pale green both above and below, and unusually for a willow, are often arranged in opposite pairs or whorls of three, rather than alternate. The flowers are produced in small catkins 1–2.5 cm long in early spring; they are brownish to reddish in colour. It is dioecious, with male and female catkins on separate plants.

It is closely related to the European and western Asian Salix purpurea, and has been treated as a variety of it by some authors, as S. purpurea var. multinervis (Franchet & Savatier) Matsumura, or as a subspecies S. purpurea subsp. amplexicaulis (Chaubard) C.K.Schneid.

== Cultivation and uses ==
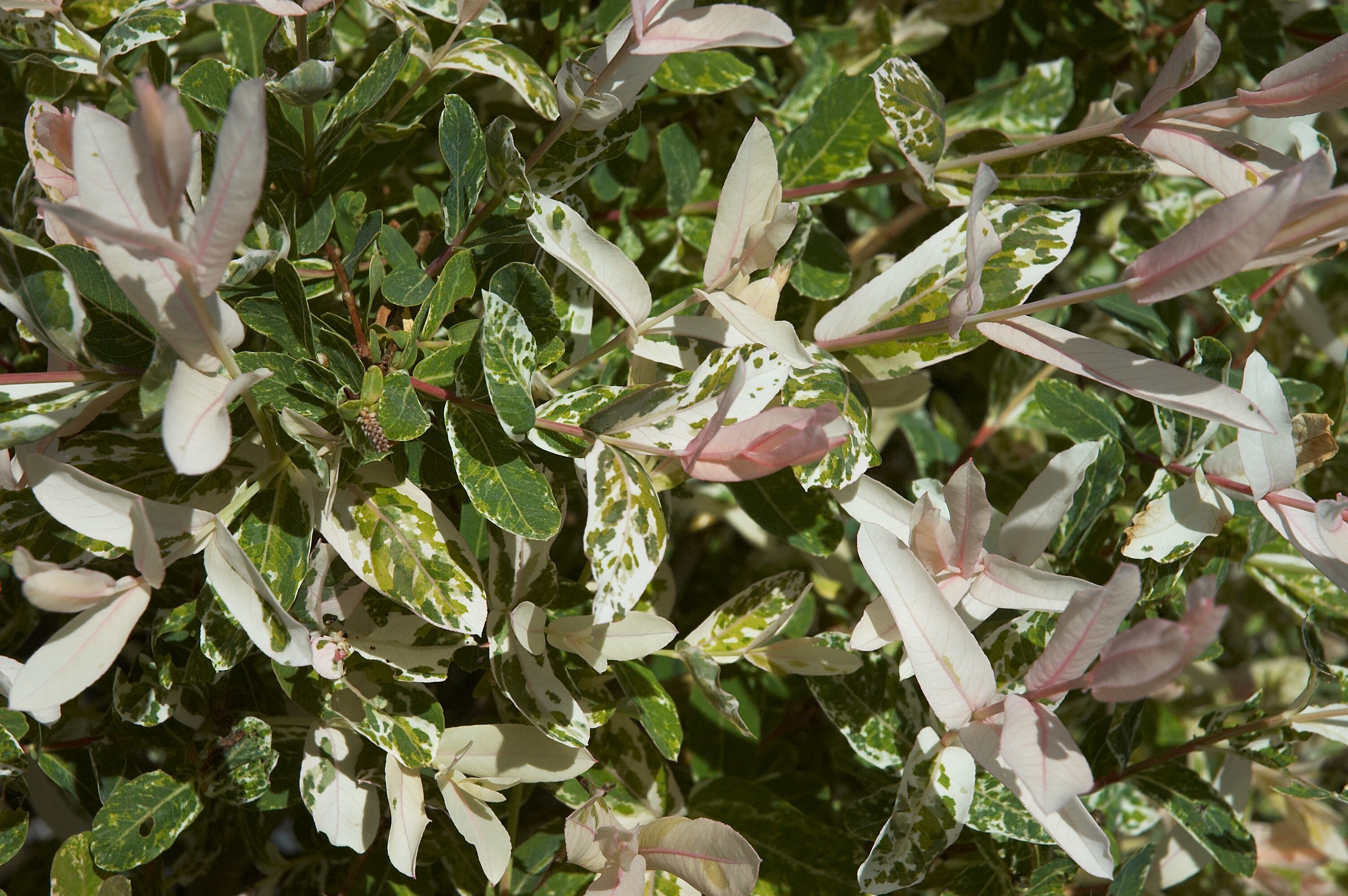
Salix integra 'Hakuro Nishiki'

The cultivar 'Hakuro Nishiki' (dappled willow) is widely grown as an ornamental plant for its variegated foliage, the leaves strongly mottled with patches and blotches of white and pale pink. As its growth is fairly weak and shrubby, it is commonly sold grafted on the top of a straight stem of another willow. It has gained the Royal Horticultural Society's Award of Garden Merit.

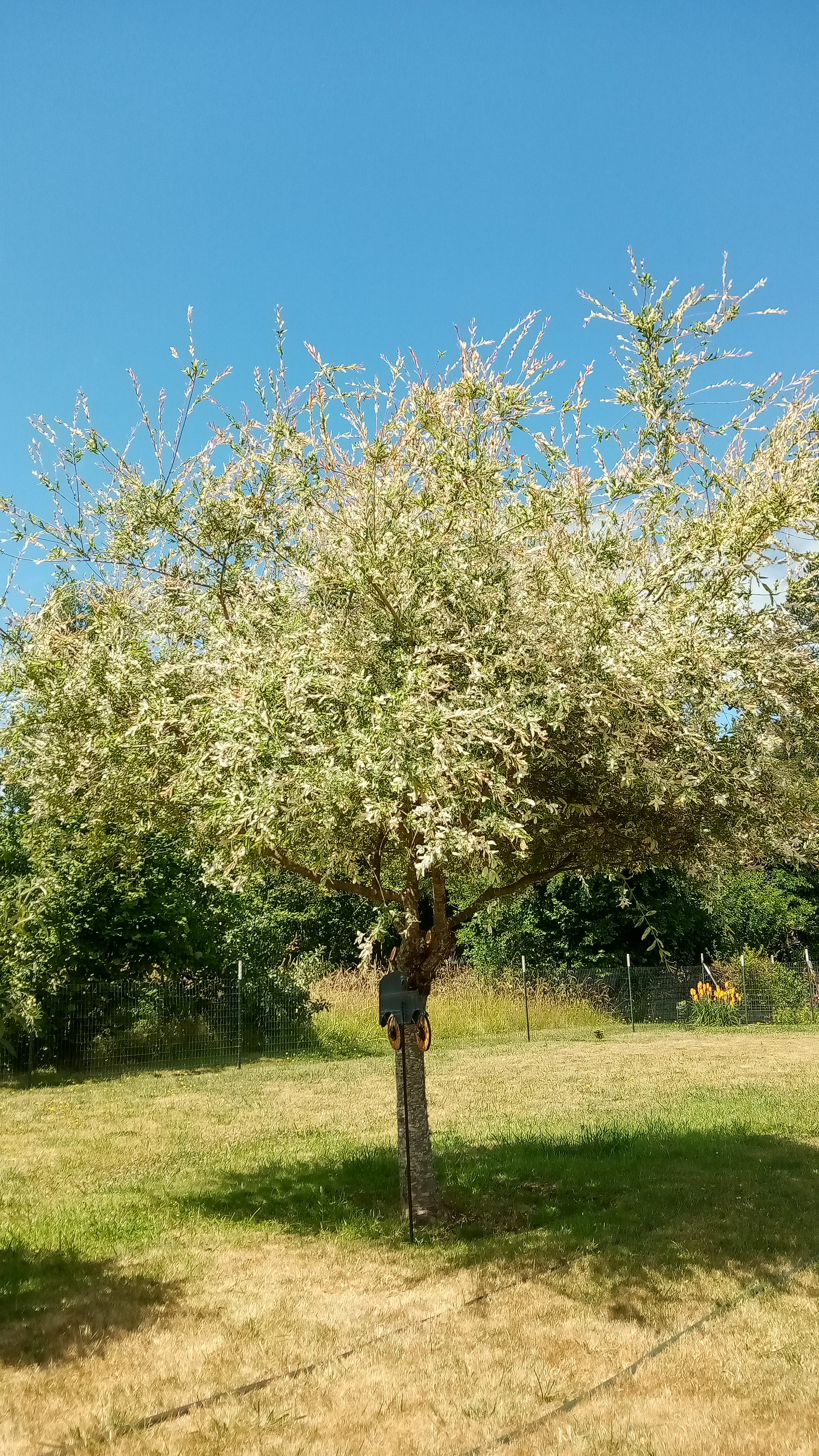

Ultimately, you would like to prune the Salix integra in the shape of a globe for the first 3 years, then, check the main stem below the head and prune away completely any growth from it. Salix Integra generally are grafted onto a quick growing willow variety and any growth from the main stem is unwanted.
