= Acleris longipalpana =

Scientific classification
- Kingdom: Animalia
- Phylum: Arthropoda
- Class: Insecta
- Order: Lepidoptera
- Family: Tortricidae
- Genus: Acleris
- Species: A. longipalpana

Binomial name
- Acleris longipalpana (Snellen, 1883)

Synonyms
- Teras longipalpana Snellen, 1883; Acleris electrina Razowski & Yasuda, 1964

Species of moth

Acleris longipalpana is a species of moth of the family Tortricidae. It is found in South Korea, China, Japan and Russia (Ussuri).

The wingspan is 21–24 mm. There is one generation per year with adults on wing from July to August.

Their larvae feed on Pinus koraiensis.
