= Antichlidas holocnista =

Scientific classification
- Kingdom: Animalia
- Phylum: Arthropoda
- Class: Insecta
- Order: Lepidoptera
- Family: Tortricidae
- Genus: Antichlidas
- Species: A. holocnista

Binomial name
- Antichlidas holocnista Meyrick, 1931

Species of moth

Antichlidas holocnista is a species of moth of the family Tortricidae. It is found in China (Zhejiang, Jiangxi, Hubei, Hunan, Sichuan, Guizhou), Korea, and Japan (Hokkaido, Honshu, Shikoku, Kyushu, Tsushima, Yakushima).

The wingspan is 12–18 mm.
