= Acleris amurensis =

Scientific classification
- Domain: Eukaryota
- Kingdom: Animalia
- Phylum: Arthropoda
- Class: Insecta
- Order: Lepidoptera
- Family: Tortricidae
- Genus: Acleris
- Species: A. amurensis

Binomial name
- Acleris amurensis (Caradja, 1928)

Synonyms
- Acalla amurensis Caradja, 1928

Species of moth

Acleris amurensis is a species of moth of the family Tortricidae. It is found in Korea, China, Japan and the Russian Far East.

The wingspan is 25–30 mm.

The larvae feed on Populus tremula.
