= Acleris filipjevi =

Scientific classification
- Domain: Eukaryota
- Kingdom: Animalia
- Phylum: Arthropoda
- Class: Insecta
- Order: Lepidoptera
- Family: Tortricidae
- Genus: Acleris
- Species: A. filipjevi

Binomial name
- Acleris filipjevi Obraztsov, 1956

Synonyms
- Peronea grisea Filipjev, 1931

Species of moth

Acleris filipjevi is a species of moth of the family Tortricidae. It is found in South Korea, China, Japan and Russia (Siberia, Amur, Ussuri).

The wingspan is 21–24 mm. There are two generations per year, with adults on wing in July and again from September to October.

The larvae feed on Fraxinus mandshurica.
