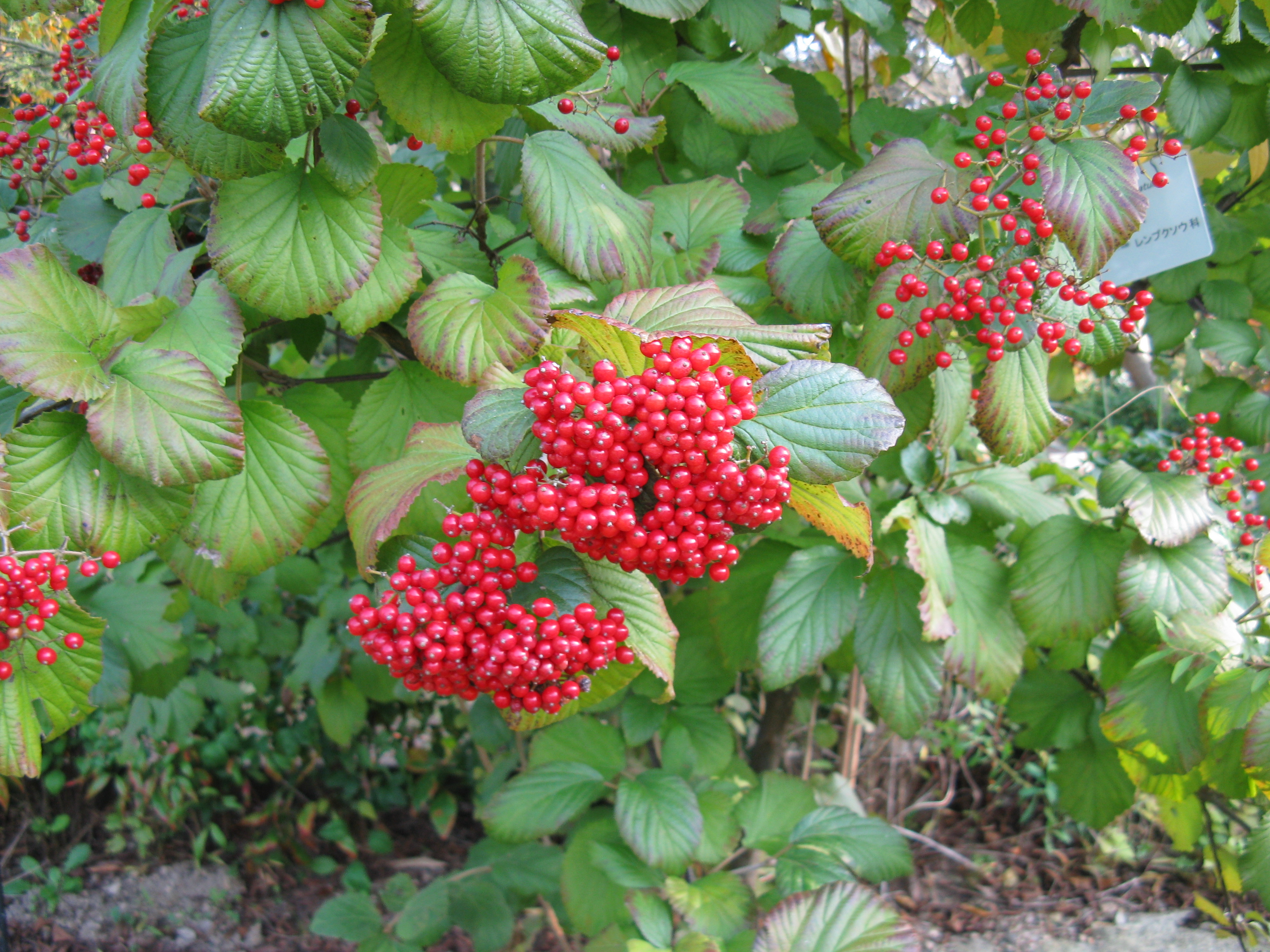
- Plant with fruit

Scientific classification
- Kingdom: Plantae
- Clade: Tracheophytes
- Clade: Angiosperms
- Clade: Eudicots
- Clade: Asterids
- Order: Dipsacales
- Family: Viburnaceae
- Genus: Viburnum
- Species: V. dilatatum

Binomial name
- Viburnum dilatatum Thunb.

= Viburnum dilatatum =

Species of shrub

Viburnum dilatatum, commonly known as linden arrowwood or linden viburnum, is a deciduous shrub in the family Viburnaceae. It is native to eastern Asia, and can be found as an introduced plant in the mid-Atlantic regions in the U.S from New York to Virginia. Linden arrowwood is known for the clusters of red drupes it produces when it is mature.

== Description ==
Viburnum dilatatum can grow up to 3 meters tall and wide. The bark of the stems are brown with some orange, the stems are pubescent, and stems change color from brown to a dark gray as they mature. The leaves are simple, arranged opposite on a branch and the shape may vary from broadly obovate, obovate, or broadly ovate. The size of the leaf ranges from 5.1–13 centimetres (2.0–5.1 in) long and 2.5–6.4 centimetres (0.98–2.52 in) wide. The leaves have shallowly toothed margins, usually are pubescent and they drop in late autumn. With the season change, linden arrowwood foliage changes. During the summer the foliage is dark green and during the autumn season the colors vary from bronze to burgundy.

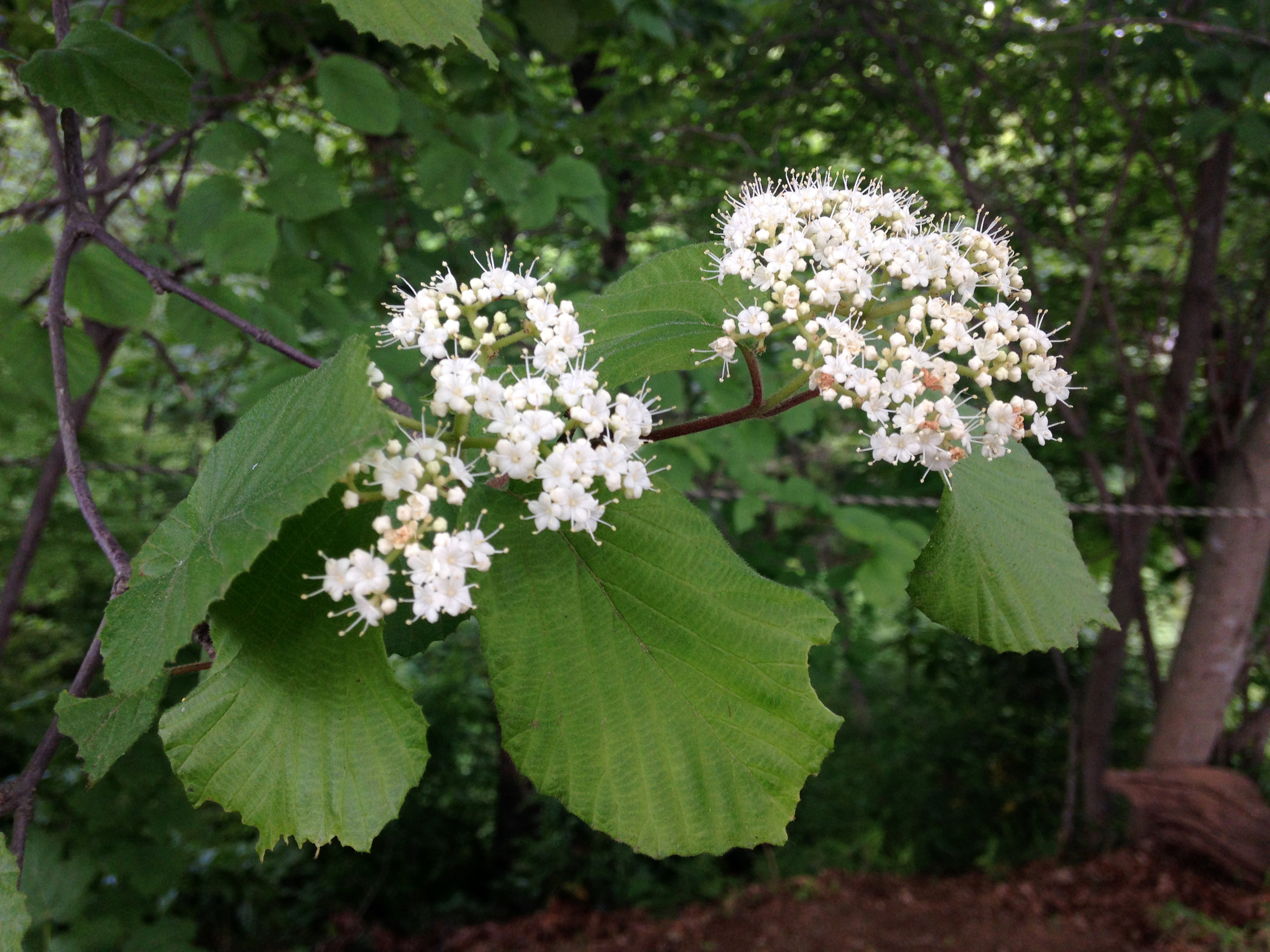
Viburnum dilatatum in flower

The flowers for linden arrowwood bloom after the leaves. They are in clusters that are small and the color is a creamy white, they bloom from May to early June. The flowers have both female and male parts which makes it a perfect flower. Perfect meaning they are plants that have both stamens and styles.

The fruit is a red glabrous fleshy round drupe that grows in clusters like its flowers, they have red color from September to early December—an individual berry measures 0.84 centimetres (0.33 in) in diameter. The berries are called gamazumi in Japan.

== Taxonomy ==
The taxonomic placement of the genus of Viburnum has been fluid in recent years. Many older sources place Viburnum in the honeysuckle family (Caprifoliaceae). However, modern classification using molecular phylogeny places the genus in Adoxaceae. Within Adoxaceae, Viburnum is the largest clade, with 175 species. Sister species to Viburnum dilatatum are Viburnum acerifolium, Viburnum denatatum, Viburnum ellipticum, Viburnum erosum, Viburnum japonicum, Viburnum kansuense, Viburnum lobophyllum, Viburnum melanocarpum, Viburnum molle, and Viburnum rafinesquianum.

Viburnum dilatatum can be confused with Viburnum dentatum. Viburnum dentatum leaves are rounder and deeply toothed and can be very pubescent or glabrous. Also, Viburnum dentatum have dark purple round fruits, while Viburnum dilatatum have red round fruits. Viburnum wrightii is also often confused with Viburnum dilatatum, another ornamental plant. The difference is that Viburnum wrightii leaves are not as pubescent, and the stem and the leaves have a waxy coat.

== Distribution and habitat ==
In its native range of China, Japan, and Korea, Linden arrowwood can be found in lowlands, open forests, and scrubby areas. This species thrive in moist soil and sunny areas.

In the early 1800s, linden arrowwood was introduced into the United States to serve as an ornamental. This plant has spread only locally in the United States, and its populations are concentrated in the Mid-Atlantic region. In some US states where linden arrowwood is found, there have been reports of it being an invasive species.

== Uses ==
Linden viburnum is an ornamental plant. It is used for mass plantings because of the white clusters of flowers it produces. Even though it is an ornamental plant, in some US states, particularly the mid-Atlantic region it is highly recommended not to plant this species because of its invasive tendencies. The berries, leaves, and stems are used in traditional Chinese medicine to make a soup for snake bites, for dysentery, and for use as a vermifuge.

== Ecology ==
This species is dispersed by way of animals. The red berries attract birds, which ingest and may deposit the seeds in other areas. In the United States, Linden arrowwood is an invasive species. It is considered a threat to native species because shade the foliage produces may limit the sunlight to other plants near it. Also, Viburnum dilatatum has an advantage due to the growth of the leaves which come out in the spring and are kept until late in the fall. Countermeasures that are strongly recommended in order to decrease the reproduction of the species are to pull them out of the ground if they are under 0.91 metres (3 ft 0 in) in height, or for taller plants, to cut to ground level before it fruits and spray with a herbicide in order to stop growth The seed heads from mature plants should be removed to stop dispersal.

== Cultivation ==
Linden arrowwood should be grown in moist fertile soil that is slightly acidic or neutral to have best results. It needs plenty of sunlight, but will thrive in shaded areas and in warm climates. Viburnum dilatatum can easily be transplanted and will do great when established. This shrub propagates from cuttings. Seeds may need a chilling period to germinate. Planting several of these shrubs next to each other will increase the fruit production. There have not been any reports in the United States claiming this species to be harmful to fauna.
