= Acleris similis =

Scientific classification
- Domain: Eukaryota
- Kingdom: Animalia
- Phylum: Arthropoda
- Class: Insecta
- Order: Lepidoptera
- Family: Tortricidae
- Genus: Acleris
- Species: A. similis

Binomial name
- Acleris similis (Filipjev, 1931)

Synonyms
- Peronea similis Filipjev, 1931

Species of moth

Acleris similis is a species of moth of the family Tortricidae. It is found in Kazakhstan, China, Japan and Russia.

The wingspan is about 22 mm.

The larvae feed on Spiraea sericea, Spiraea salicifolia, Rosa davuricum and Vaccinium uliginosum.
