= Coenobiodes acceptana =

Scientific classification
- Domain: Eukaryota
- Kingdom: Animalia
- Phylum: Arthropoda
- Class: Insecta
- Order: Lepidoptera
- Family: Tortricidae
- Genus: Coenobiodes
- Species: C. acceptana

Binomial name
- Coenobiodes acceptana Kuznetzov, 1973

Species of moth

Coenobiodes acceptana is a species of moth of the family Tortricidae. It is found in China (Zhejiang, Anhui, Guizhou) and Japan (Honshu).

The wingspan is about 16 mm.
