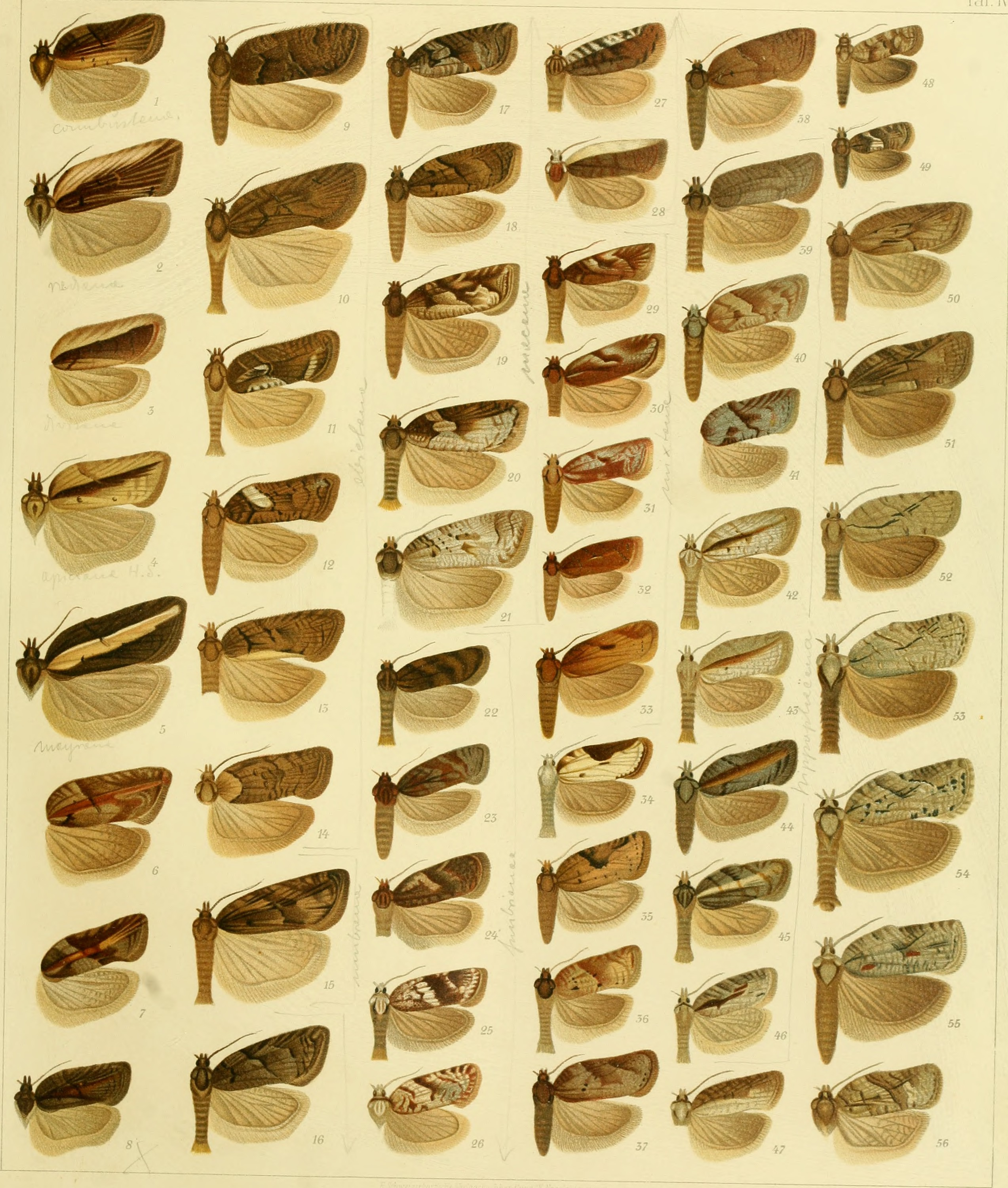
- Acleris albiscapulana as Acalla albiscapulana in Die palaearktischen tortriciden

Scientific classification
- Domain: Eukaryota
- Kingdom: Animalia
- Phylum: Arthropoda
- Class: Insecta
- Order: Lepidoptera
- Family: Tortricidae
- Genus: Acleris
- Species: A. albiscapulana

Binomial name
- Acleris albiscapulana (Christoph, 1881)

Synonyms
- Teras albiscapulana Christoph, 1881

= Acleris albiscapulana =

Species of moth

Acleris albiscapulana is a species of moth of the family Tortricidae. It is found in Japan (Hokkaido, Honshu, Shikoku), the Korean Peninsula and the Russian Far East (Ussuri). The habitat consists of fir-yew broad-leaved and oak forests.

The wingspan is 17–20 mm. Adults have been recorded on wing from May to June and again from August to October. The species probably overwinters as an adult.
