= Acleris alnivora =

Scientific classification
- Domain: Eukaryota
- Kingdom: Animalia
- Phylum: Arthropoda
- Class: Insecta
- Order: Lepidoptera
- Family: Tortricidae
- Genus: Acleris
- Species: A. alnivora

Binomial name
- Acleris alnivora Oku, 1956

Species of moth

Acleris alnivora is a species of moth of the family Tortricidae. It is found in Russia, China, Japan and Taiwan.

The wingspan is about 22 mm.

The larvae feed on Alnus japonica var. rufa and Ulmus propinqua.
