= Acleris salicicola =

Scientific classification
- Domain: Eukaryota
- Kingdom: Animalia
- Phylum: Arthropoda
- Class: Insecta
- Order: Lepidoptera
- Family: Tortricidae
- Genus: Acleris
- Species: A. salicicola

Binomial name
- Acleris salicicola Kuznetzov, 1970

Species of moth

Acleris salicicola is a species of moth of the family Tortricidae. It is found in the Russian Far East (the Kuriles) and Japan.

The wingspan is about 22 mm.

The larvae feed on Salix sachalinensis.
