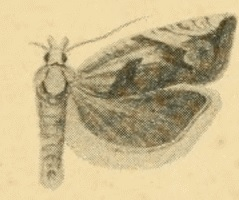

Scientific classification
- Kingdom: Animalia
- Phylum: Arthropoda
- Clade: Pancrustacea
- Class: Insecta
- Order: Lepidoptera
- Family: Tortricidae
- Genus: Eucosma
- Species: E. tundrana

Binomial name
- Eucosma tundrana (Kennel, 1900)

Synonyms
- Semasia tundrana Kennel, 1900; Semasia cordulana Rebel, 1917

= Eucosma tundrana =

Species of moth

Eucosma tundrana is a species of moth of the family Tortricidae. It is found in China (Hebei, Shanxi, Inner Mongolia, Heilongjiang, Guangxi, Shaanxi, Gansu, Ningxia, Xinjiang), Russia, Kazakhstan and Europe, where it has been recorded from Germany, the Czech Republic, Slovakia, Hungary and Romania.

The wingspan is 17–20 mm. Adults are on wing from June to August.

The larvae feed on Artemisa species.
