= Acleris indignana =

Scientific classification
- Domain: Eukaryota
- Kingdom: Animalia
- Phylum: Arthropoda
- Class: Insecta
- Order: Lepidoptera
- Family: Tortricidae
- Genus: Acleris
- Species: A. indignana

Binomial name
- Acleris indignana (Christoph, 1881)

Synonyms
- Tortrix indignana Christoph, 1881

Species of moth

Acleris indignana is a species of moth of the family Tortricidae. It is found in the Russian Far East (Ussuri) and Japan.

The wingspan is 16–18 mm.

The larvae feed on Malus baccata.
