= Acleris affinatana =

Scientific classification
- Kingdom: Animalia
- Phylum: Arthropoda
- Class: Insecta
- Order: Lepidoptera
- Family: Tortricidae
- Genus: Acleris
- Species: A. affinatana

Binomial name
- Acleris affinatana (Snellen, 1883)

Synonyms
- Teras affinatana Snellen, 1883; Acleris affinitana Issiki, 1932; Oxygrapha pryerana Walsingham, 1900

Species of moth

Acleris affinatana is a species of moth of the family Tortricidae. It is found in South Korea, North Korea, China, Japan and Russia (Siberia, Amur).

The wingspan is about 18 mm.

The larvae feed on Quercus dentata, Quercus serrata, Quercus acutissima and Zelkovia scheideriana.
