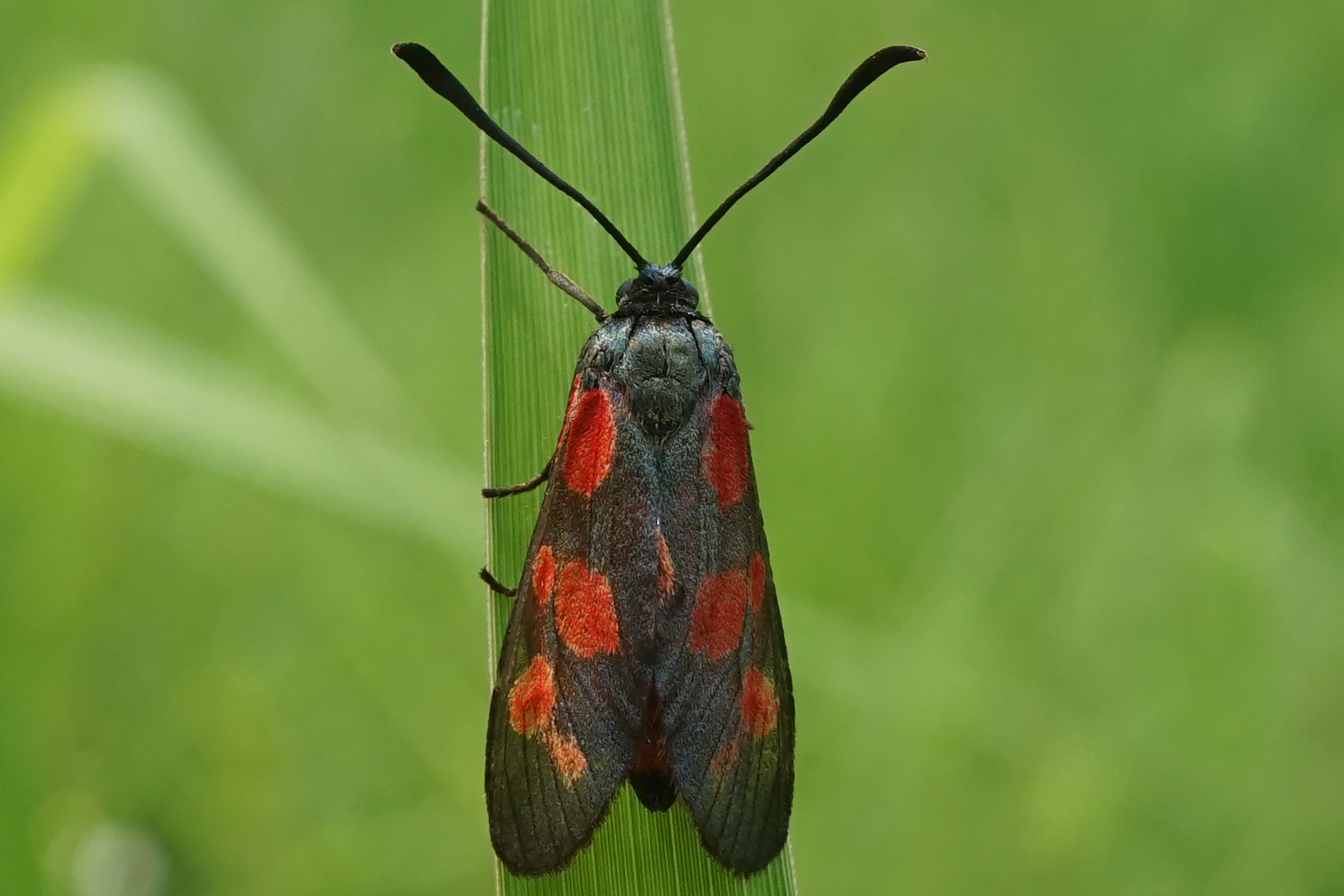

Scientific classification
- Kingdom: Animalia
- Phylum: Arthropoda
- Class: Insecta
- Order: Lepidoptera
- Family: Zygaenidae
- Genus: Zygaena
- Species: Z. niphona

Binomial name
- Zygaena niphona Butler, 1877

= Zygaena niphona =

Species of moth

Zygaena niphona is a species of moth in the Zygaenidae family. It is found in the east Palearctic (Amur Oblast, Korea, Japan). In Seitz it is described Z. niphona Btlr. (= christophi Stgr.) (6e). The only Burnet from East Asia. Rather large, sparsely scaled, 5 spotted, with rather wide red abdominal belt. Club of antenna strongly incrassate at apex. The insect has the appearance of a large meliloti, but the body is strong and robust, the flight however being nevertheless not at all fast. Though the species varies considerably, some specimens being 6 spotted and resembling therefore Z. peucedani, there are no local races. The abdominal belt occupies mostly 2 segments, but is sometimes restricted to one segment, the posterior portion of the abdomen being occasionally all red. The species is widely distributed in Japan, especially at low altitudes of the central mountains, near and on the Fujisan; probably more sporadic in Amurland, since Graeser did not meet with it.

== Subspecies ==
- Zygaena niphona Butler, 1877
- Z. n. christophi Staudinger, 1887
