= Acleris japonica =

Scientific classification
- Domain: Eukaryota
- Kingdom: Animalia
- Phylum: Arthropoda
- Class: Insecta
- Order: Lepidoptera
- Family: Tortricidae
- Genus: Acleris
- Species: A. japonica

Binomial name
- Acleris japonica (Walsingham, 1900)

Synonyms
- Oxygrapha japonica Walsingham, 1900

Species of moth

Acleris japonica is a species of moth of the family Tortricidae. It is found in Japan.

The wingspan is 13–17 mm.

The larvae feed on Zelkova serrata and Quercus acutissima.
