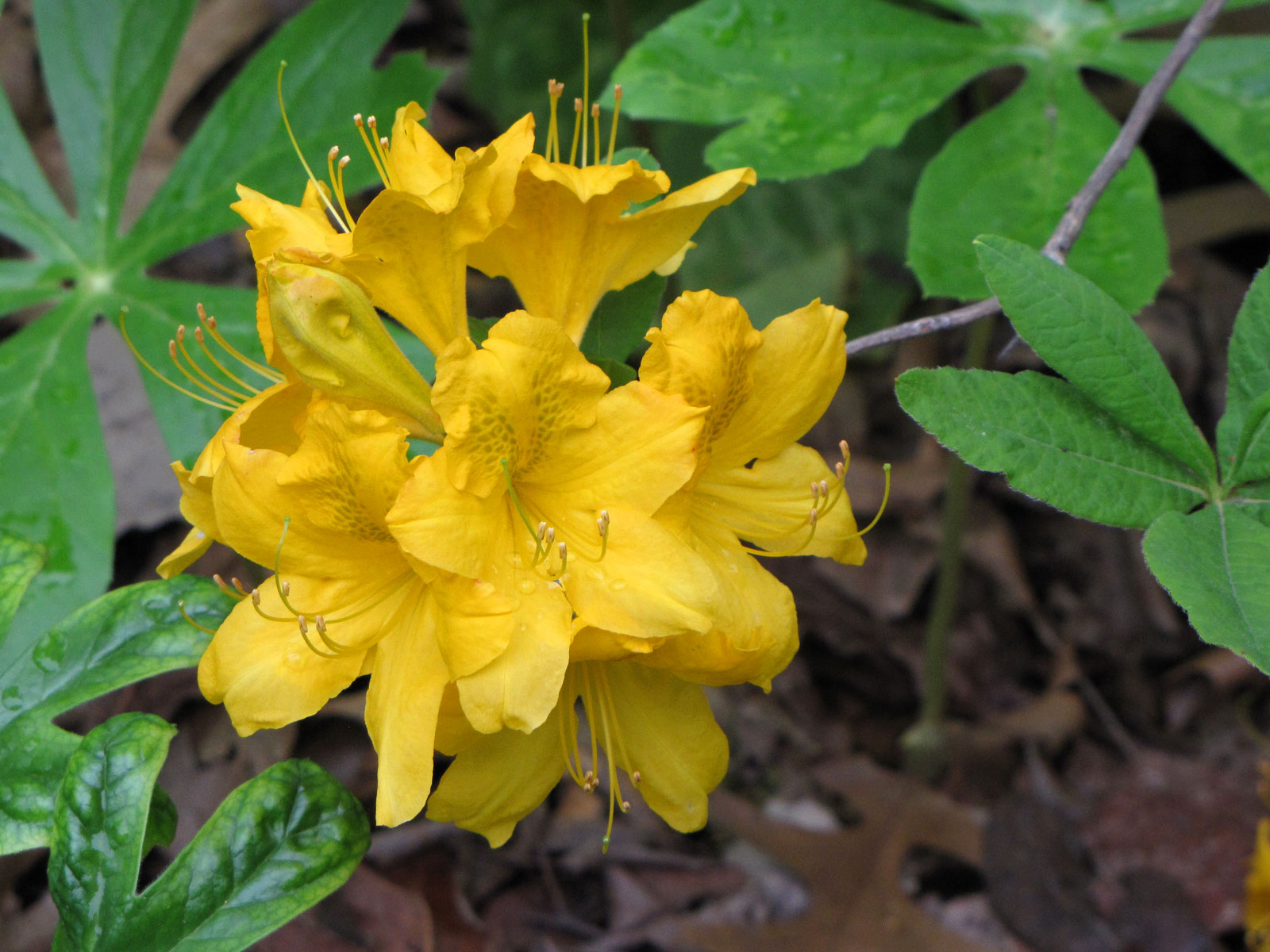

Scientific classification
- Kingdom: Plantae
- Clade: Tracheophytes
- Clade: Angiosperms
- Clade: Eudicots
- Clade: Asterids
- Order: Ericales
- Family: Ericaceae
- Genus: Rhododendron
- Species: R. molle

Binomial name
- Rhododendron molle (Blume) G.Don

Synonyms
- Azalea mollis Blume; Azalea sinensis G.Lodd.; Rhododendron davisii Koehne; Rhododendron sinense (Lodd.) Sweet

= Rhododendron molle =

Species of plant

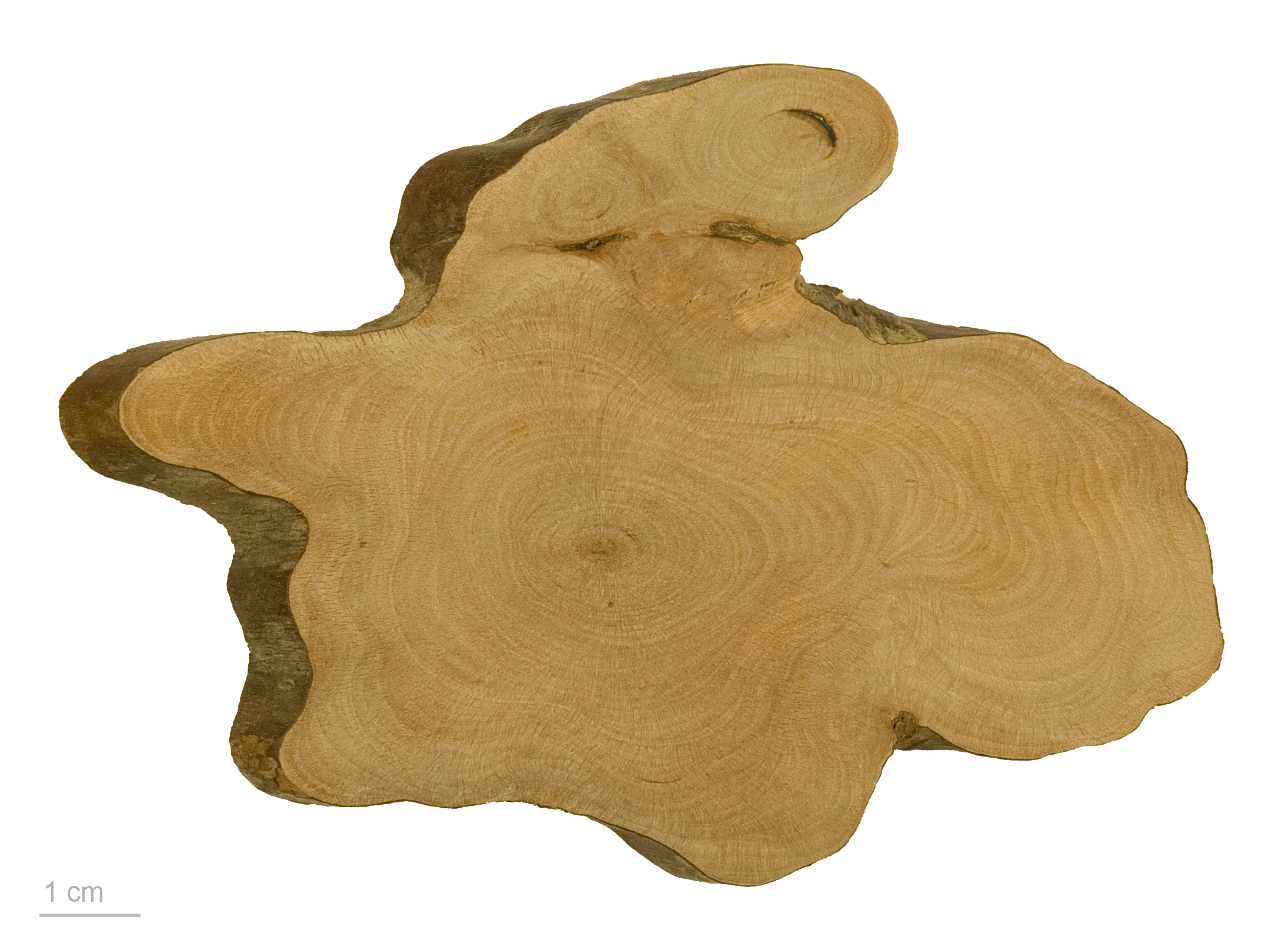
Rhododendron molle - MHNT

Rhododendron molle (羊踯躅) is a rhododendron species native to China and Japan, where it grows at altitudes of sea level to 2500 meters. This deciduous shrub grows to 50–200 cm (20–79 in) in height, with leaves that are oblong to oblong-lanceolate, 5–11 by 1.5–3.5 cm in size. The flowers are yellow with dark red flecks.

This azalea is not often seen in cultivation, but is the parent of many yellow-flowered hybrids.
