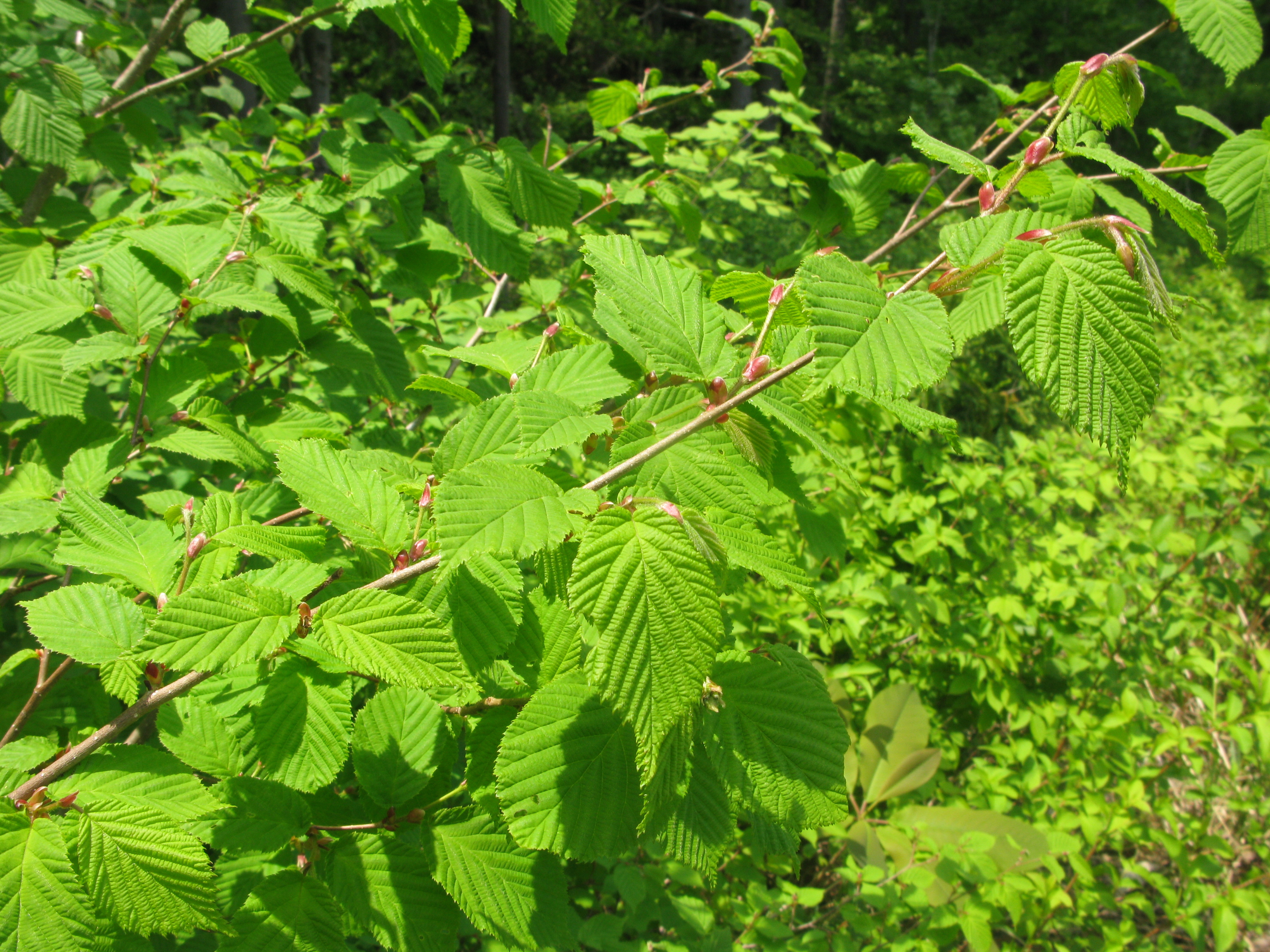
- Branch of Corylus sieboldiana

Conservation status
- Least Concern (IUCN 3.1)

Scientific classification
- Kingdom: Plantae
- Clade: Embryophytes
- Clade: Tracheophytes
- Clade: Angiosperms
- Clade: Eudicots
- Clade: Rosids
- Order: Fagales
- Family: Betulaceae
- Genus: Corylus
- Species: C. sieboldiana

Binomial name
- Corylus sieboldiana Blume

Synonyms
- Corylus heterophylla var. sieboldiana (Blume) A.DC.; Corylus rostrata var. sieboldiana (Blume) Maxim.

= Corylus sieboldiana =

Species of flowering plant

Corylus sieboldiana is a species of flowering plant in the family Betulaceae. It is a shrub native to northeastern Asia, including Japan, Korea, Manchuria and Inner Mongolia in northern China, and Amur Oblast, Chita Oblast, Khabarovsk Krai, and Primorsky Krai in southeastern Siberia. It grows up to 5 metres tall in mixed temperate forests and forest openings.

== Distribution and habitat ==
Corylus sieboldiana is a shrub that lives in mountainous forests and thickets and is native mostly to Korea and Japan.

== Classification ==
Corylus sieboldiana is classified under the genus Corylus in the family Betulaceae.
