= Acleris enitescens =

Scientific classification
- Kingdom: Animalia
- Phylum: Arthropoda
- Class: Insecta
- Order: Lepidoptera
- Family: Tortricidae
- Genus: Acleris
- Species: A. enitescens

Binomial name
- Acleris enitescens (Meyrick, 1912)

Synonyms
- Peronea enitescens Meyrick, 1912

Species of moth

Acleris enitescens is a species of moth of the family Tortricidae. It is found in India (Assam), Taiwan, China, Japan and on Java and Sumatra.

The wingspan is 11–17 mm. The forewings are ferruginous, the basal area with violet reflections. There is a blotch of ochreous-yellowish suffusion and two fasciae of pale violet iridescence. The hindwings are grey.

The larvae feed on Rubus species, including Rubus microphyllus and Rubus sachalinensis.
