= Coenobiodes abietiella =

Scientific classification
- Kingdom: Animalia
- Phylum: Arthropoda
- Clade: Pancrustacea
- Class: Insecta
- Order: Lepidoptera
- Family: Tortricidae
- Genus: Coenobiodes
- Species: C. abietiella

Binomial name
- Coenobiodes abietiella (Matsumura, 1931)

Synonyms
- Laspeyresia abietiella Matsumura, 1931

Species of moth

Coenobiodes abietiella is a species of moth of the family Tortricidae. It is found in China (Fujian, Guangdong), Japan and Russia.

The wingspan is 11.5-12.5 mm.

The larvae feed on Taxus cuspidata.
