= Acleris exsucana =

Scientific classification
- Domain: Eukaryota
- Kingdom: Animalia
- Phylum: Arthropoda
- Class: Insecta
- Order: Lepidoptera
- Family: Tortricidae
- Genus: Acleris
- Species: A. exsucana

Binomial name
- Acleris exsucana (Kennel, 1901)

Synonyms
- Rhacodia exsucana Kennel, 1901

Species of moth

Acleris exsucana is a species of moth of the family Tortricidae. It is found in the Russian Far East (Ussuri), North Korea and Japan.

The wingspan is about 22 mm.

The larvae feed on Deutzia scabra and Viburnum opulus var. calvescens.
