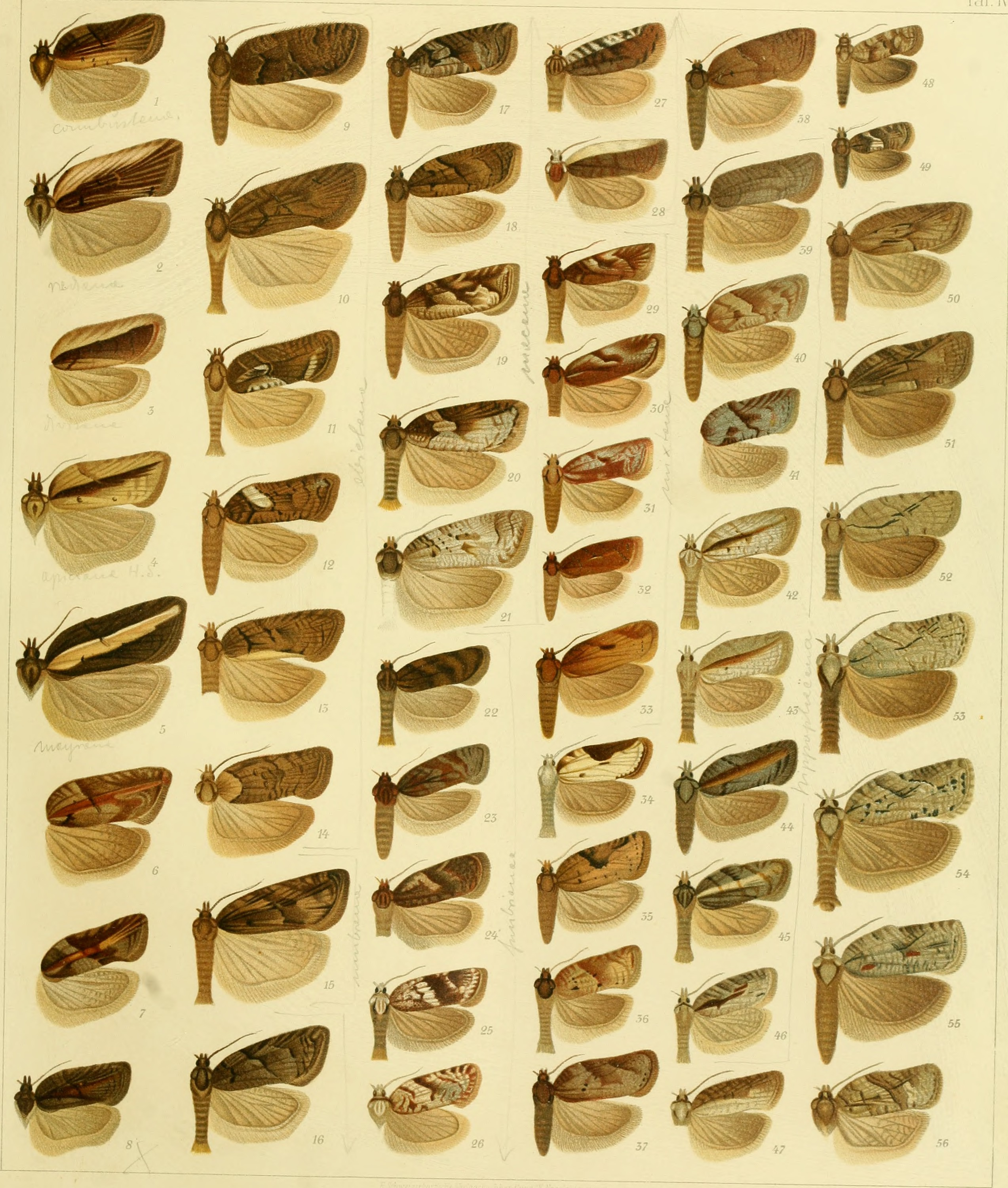
- Acleris hispidana as Acalla hispidana in Die palaearktischen tortriciden figs 51–56

Scientific classification
- Domain: Eukaryota
- Kingdom: Animalia
- Phylum: Arthropoda
- Class: Insecta
- Order: Lepidoptera
- Family: Tortricidae
- Genus: Acleris
- Species: A. hispidana

Binomial name
- Acleris hispidana (Christoph, 1881)

Synonyms
- Teras hispidana Christoph, 1881

= Acleris hispidana =

Species of moth

Acleris hispidana is a species of moth of the family Tortricidae. It is found in South Korea, China, Japan and Russia (Vladivostok, Amur).

The wingspan is 21–26 mm. Adults are on wing in May and from September to October.

The larvae feed on Quercus mongolica.
