= Acleris paradiseana =

Scientific classification
- Kingdom: Animalia
- Phylum: Arthropoda
- Clade: Pancrustacea
- Class: Insecta
- Order: Lepidoptera
- Family: Tortricidae
- Genus: Acleris
- Species: A. paradiseana

Binomial name
- Acleris paradiseana (Walsingham, 1900)

Synonyms
- Oxygrapha paradiseana Walsingham, 1900

Species of moth

Acleris paradiseana is a species of moth of the family Tortricidae. It is found in the Russian Far East (Amur, Ussuri, Sakhalin, the Kuriles) and Japan.

The wingspan is 22–23 mm. There are alternate bands of pale yellowish green and pale leaden grey on the forewings, as well as a large bright golden yellow tornal patch. The hindwings are reddish brown.

The larvae feed on Sorbus sambucifolia, Malus pumila, Crataegus maximowiczi, Crataegus pinnatifida and Micromeles alnifolia.
