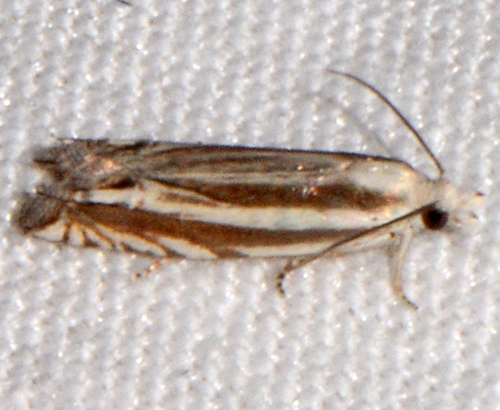
- Phaneta striatana

Scientific classification
- Domain: Eukaryota
- Kingdom: Animalia
- Phylum: Arthropoda
- Class: Insecta
- Order: Lepidoptera
- Family: Tortricidae
- Subfamily: Olethreutinae
- Tribe: Eucosmini; Meyrick, 1909

Genera
- See text

Synonyms
- Penthininae Guenée, 1845; Spilonotinae Guenée, 1845; Stigmonotidae Stainton, 1859; Epiblemidae Meyrick, 1895

= Eucosmini =

Tribe of moths

The Eucosmini are a tribe of tortrix moths.

== Genera ==
Acroclita
Age
Alischirnevalia
Allodapella
Anoecophysis
Antichlidas
Asketria
Assulella
Azuayacana
Barbara
Bascaneucosma
Bipartivalva
Biuncaria
Blastesthia
Blastopetrova
Brachiocera
Brachioxena
Catastega
Charitostega
Chimoptesis
Cirrilaspeyresia
Clavigesta
Coenobiodes
Collogenes
Cosmetra
Crimnologa
Crocidosema
Crusimetra
Demeijerella
Dicnecidia
Dinogenes
Dolichurella
Doliochastis
Eccoptocera
Emrahia
Epibactra
Epiblema
Epinotia
Episimoides
Eriopsela
Eucoenogenes
Eucosma
Eucosmophyes
Gibberifera
Gravitarmata
Gretchena
Gypsonoma
Heleanna
Hendecaneura
Hendecasticha
Hermenias
Herpystis
Herpystostena
Holocola
Icelita
Jerapowellia
Kennelia
Laculataria
Lepteucosma
Macraesthetica
Makivora
Megaherpystis
Melanodaedala
Metacosma
Mystogenes
Namasia
Neaspasia
Neobarbara
Niphadostola
Noduliferola
Notocelia
Nuntiella
Osthelderiella
Parachanda
Pelochrista
Penestostoma
Peridaedala
Phalarocarpa
Phaneta
Plutographa
Potiosa
Proteoteras
Protithona
Pseudexentera
Pseudoclita
Quebradnotia
Retinia
Rhodotoxotis
Rhopalovalva
Rhopobota
Rhyacionia
Salsolicola
Sociognatha
Sonia
Spilonota
Strepsicrates
Stygitropha
Suleima
Syngamoneura
Syropetrova
Thiodia
Thiodiodes
Thylacogaster
Tritopterna
Ustriclapex
Whittenella
Xenosocia
Yunusemreia
Zeiraphera

== Unplaced species ==
- "Acroclita" macroma Turner, 1918
- "Eucosma" atelosticta Meyrick, 1925
- "Eucosma" cathareutis Meyrick, 1938
- "Eucosma" chloromima Meyrick, 1931
- "Eucosma" chlorosticha Meyrick, 1934
- "Eucosma" pentagonaspis Meyrick, 1931
- "Eucosma" rigens Meyrick, 1938
- "Eucosma" symploca Turner, 1946
- "Eucosma" tholeropis Meyrick, 1934

== Formerly placed here ==
Argepinotia
