= Alcina (disambiguation) =

Alcina is an opera by George Frideric Handel, based on Ariosto.

Alcina may also refer to:

- Alcina (name)
- Alcina, a character in Orlando furioso, epic poem by Ludovico Ariosto
- Alcina, the Hungarian name for the Romanian commune Alțâna
- Alcina Cav., taxonomic synonym of Melampodium
- Alcina Clarke, taxonomic synonym of Eccoptocera

== See also ==
- Alcine, opera by André Campra also based on Ariosto
