= Prachanda (disambiguation) =

Pushpa Kamal Dahal (commonly known as Prachanda; born 1954) is a Nepalese politician and former Prime Minister of Nepal.

Prachanda may also refer to:

- Prachanda Kulla, a 1984 Indian Kannada film
- Prachanda Putanigalu, a 1981 Indian Kannada film
- Pracchand Ashok, Indian historical television series about emperor Ashoka
- Marxism–Leninism–Maoism–Prachanda Path, ideological line of the Communist Party of Nepal (Maoist Centre)
- Bagh Prachanda Khan, a village in Beanibazar, Sylhet district, Bangladesh named after Prachanda Khan

== See also ==
- Parachanda, genus of moths
