= Melanodaedala =

Scientific classification
- Domain: Eukaryota
- Kingdom: Animalia
- Phylum: Arthropoda
- Class: Insecta
- Order: Lepidoptera
- Family: Tortricidae
- Tribe: Eucosmini
- Genus: Melanodaedala; Horak, 2006

Genus of tortrix moths

Melanodaedala is a genus of moths of the family Tortricidae.

== Species ==
- Melanodaedala diffusa (Bradley, 1957)
- Melanodaedala scopulosana (Meyrick, 1881)

== Former species ==
- Melanodaedala melanoneura (Meyrick, 1912)

== See also ==
- List of Tortricidae genera
