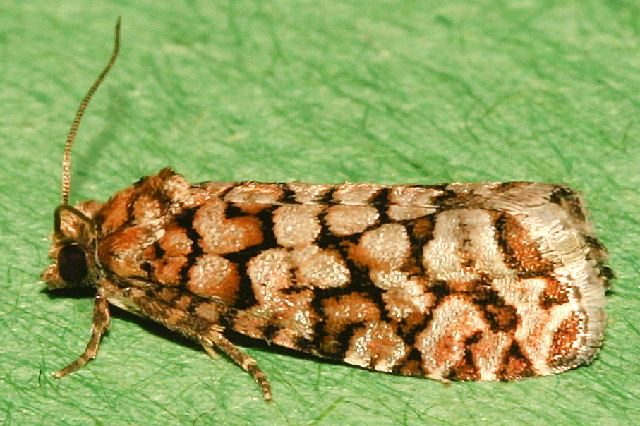
- Eucopina bobana, British Columbia

Scientific classification
- Domain: Eukaryota
- Kingdom: Animalia
- Phylum: Arthropoda
- Class: Insecta
- Order: Lepidoptera
- Family: Tortricidae
- Subfamily: Olethreutinae
- Tribe: Eucosmini
- Genus: Eucopina

= Eucopina =

Genus of moths

Eucopina is a genus of tortricid moths in the family Tortricidae found in North America. There are about nine described species in Eucopina.

== Species ==
These nine species belong to the genus Eucopina:

- Eucopina bobana (Kearfott, 1907)
- Eucopina cocana (Kearfott, 1907) (shortleaf pinecone borer moth)
- Eucopina gloriola (Heinrich, 1931) (white pine shoot-borer)
- Eucopina monitorana (Heinrich, 1920) (red pinecone borer moth)
- Eucopina ponderosa (Powell, 1968)
- Eucopina rescissoriana (Heinrich, 1920) (lodgepole pinecone borer moth)
- Eucopina siskiyouana (Kearfott, 1907) (fir cone borer)
- Eucopina sonomana (Kearfott, 1907) (western pine shoot borer moth)
- Eucopina tocullionana (Heinrich, 1920) (white pine cone borer)
