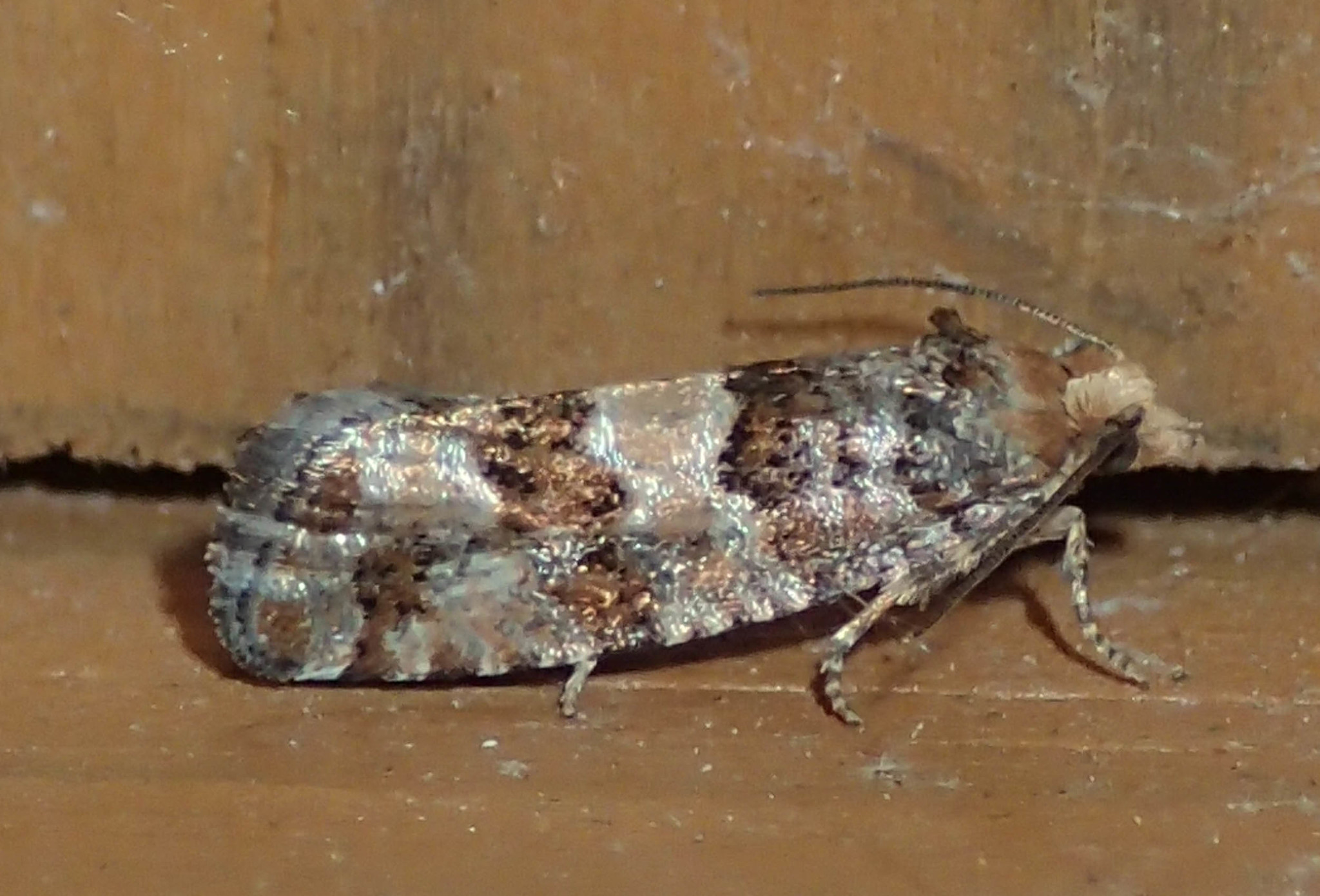
- Eucopina tocullionana, white pine cone borer, New York

Scientific classification
- Kingdom: Animalia
- Phylum: Arthropoda
- Clade: Pancrustacea
- Class: Insecta
- Order: Lepidoptera
- Family: Tortricidae
- Subfamily: Olethreutinae
- Tribe: Eucosmini
- Genus: Eucopina
- Species: E. tocullionana

Binomial name
- Eucopina tocullionana (Heinrich, 1920)

Synonyms
- Eucosma tocullionana Heinrich, 1920

= Eucopina tocullionana =

Species of moth

Eucopina tocullionana (or Eucosma tocullionana), the white pine cone borer, is a moth of the family Tortricidae. It is found in North America from Minnesota to Quebec, south in the Appalachian Mountains to northern Georgia.

The wingspan is about 18 mm. Adults can be found from early May to August. There is one generation per year.

The larvae feed in the cones of Pinus strobus and Pinus virginiana. Larvae can be found from mid-June to the end of August.

== Gallery ==
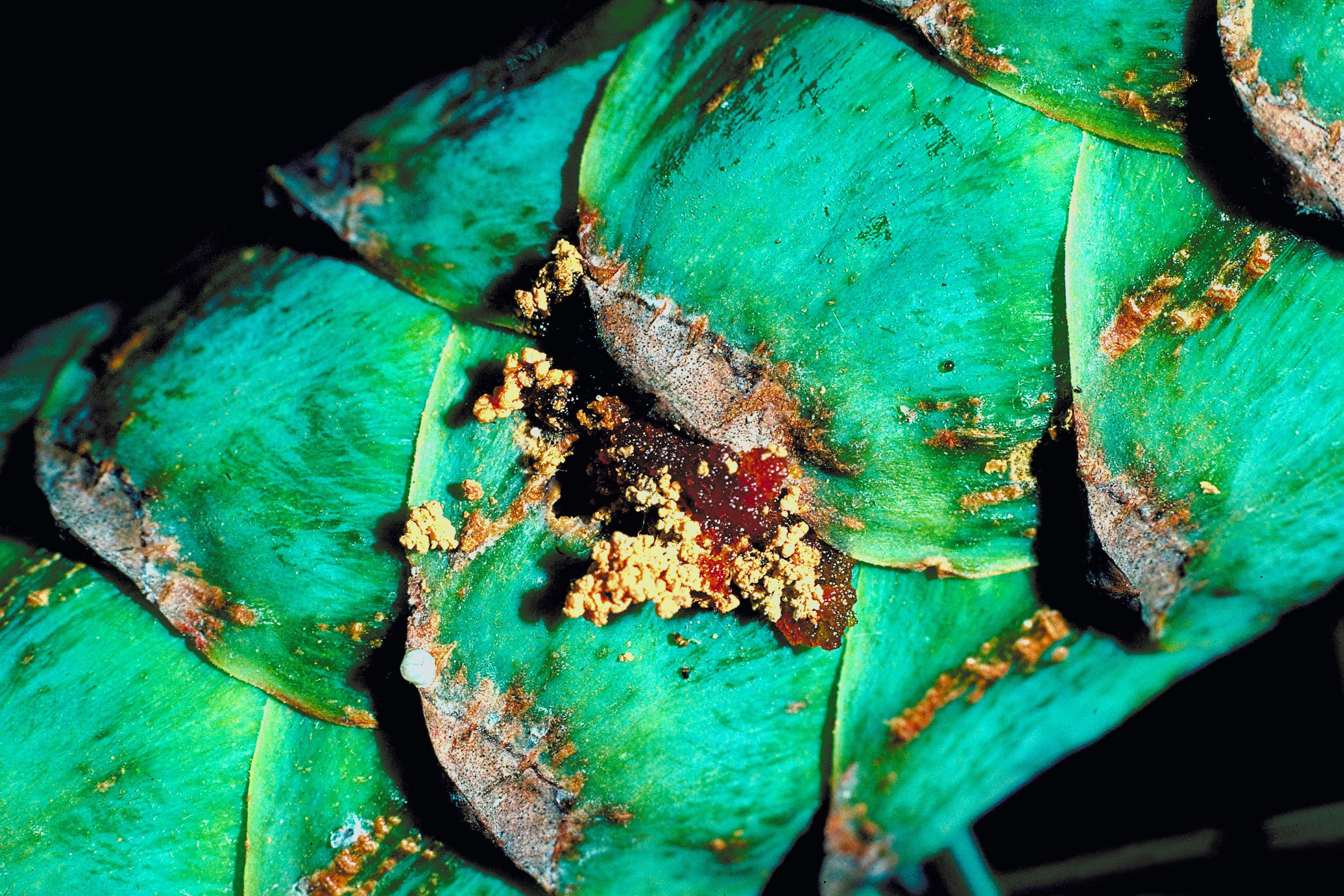
Damage

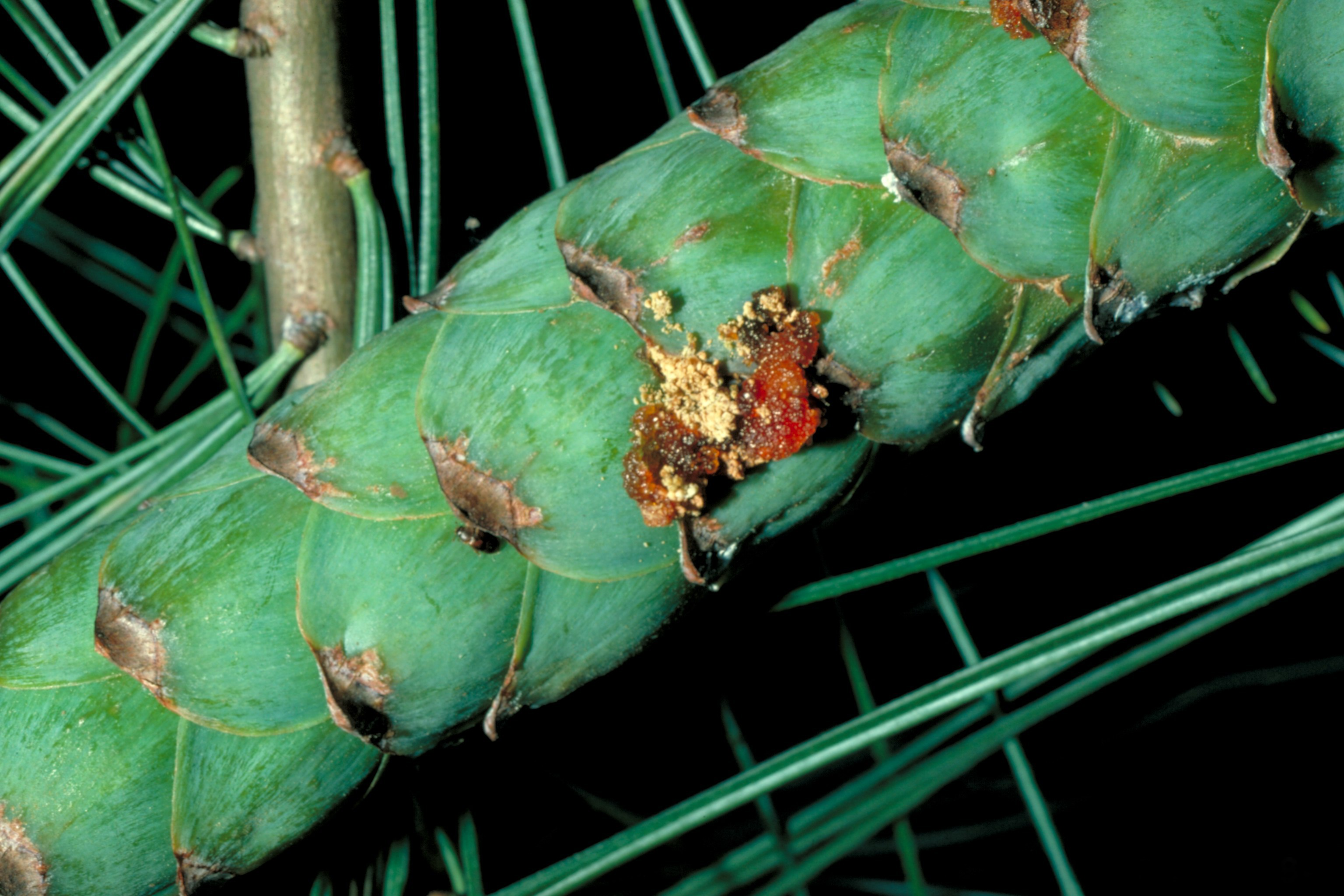
Damage

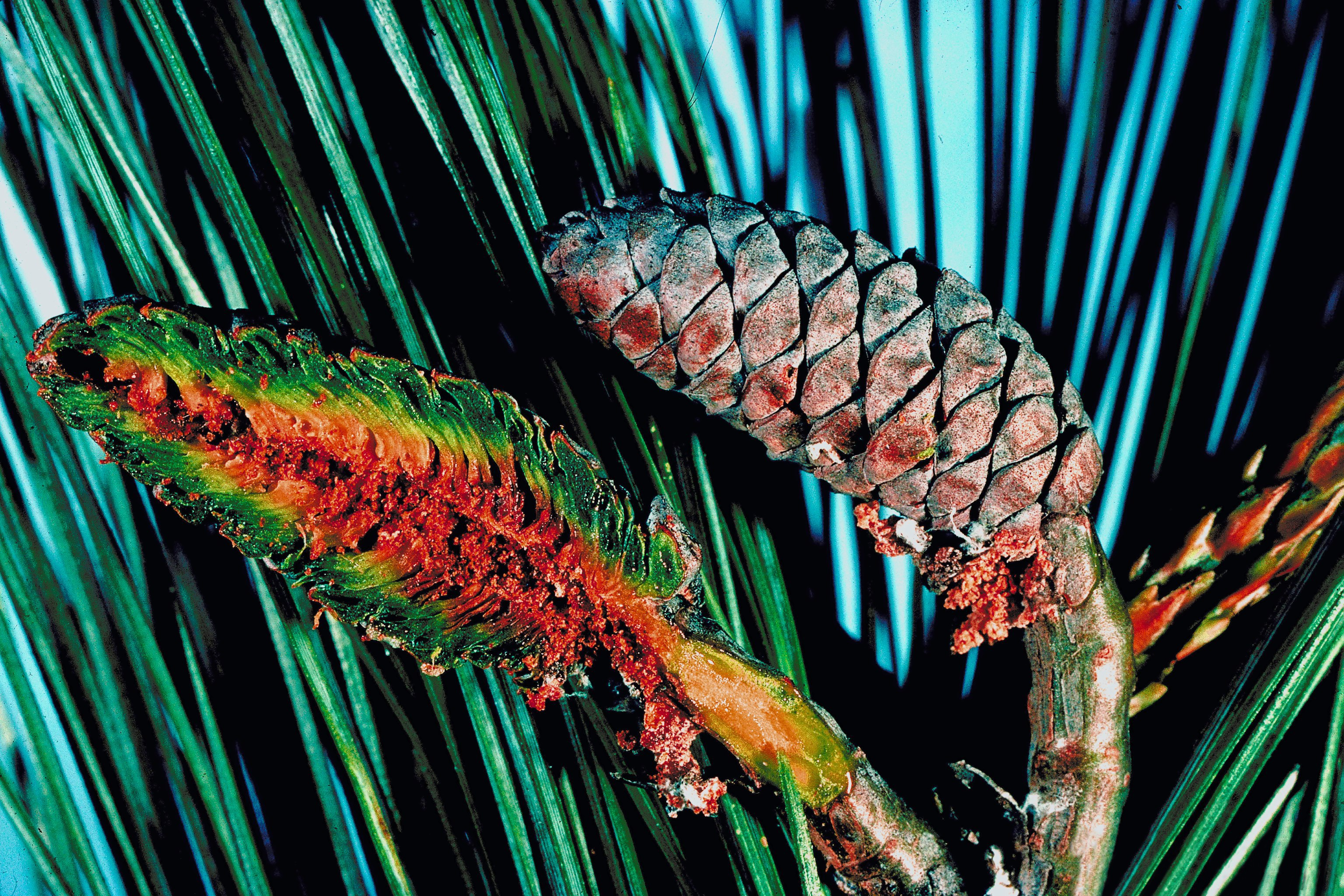
Damage

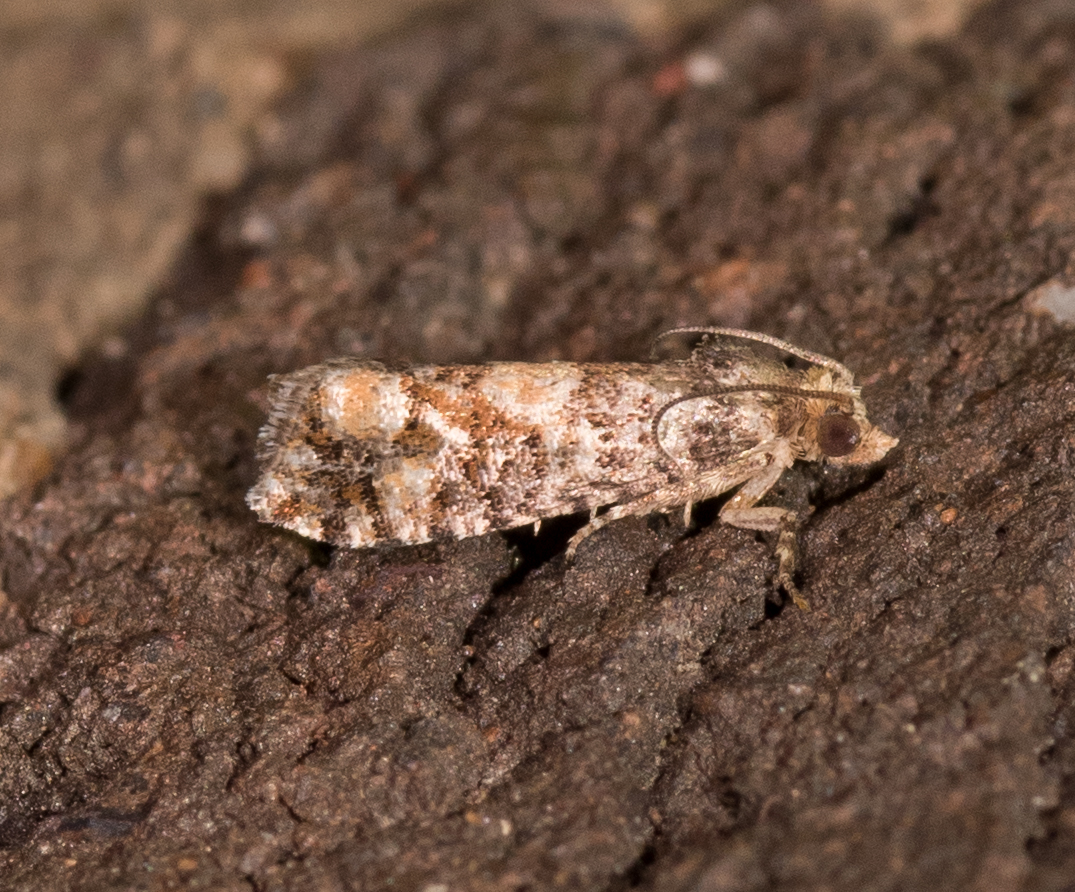
Adult
