= Biuncaria kenteana =

Scientific classification
- Domain: Eukaryota
- Kingdom: Animalia
- Phylum: Arthropoda
- Class: Insecta
- Order: Lepidoptera
- Family: Tortricidae
- Genus: Biuncaria
- Species: B. kenteana

Binomial name
- Biuncaria kenteana (Staudinger, 1892)

Synonyms
- Grapholitha kenteana Staudinger, 1892

Species of moth

Biuncaria kenteana is a species of moth of the family Tortricidae. It is found in China (Heilongjiang), Mongolia and Russia (the South Siberian Mountains).
