= Hendecaneura =

Scientific classification
- Kingdom: Animalia
- Phylum: Arthropoda
- Class: Insecta
- Order: Lepidoptera
- Family: Tortricidae
- Subfamily: Olethreutinae
- Tribe: Eucosmini
- Genus: Hendecaneura; Walsingham, 1900

Synonyms
- Eucosmodes Kuznetsov, 1973

Genus of moths

Hendecaneura is a genus of moths belonging to the subfamily Olethreutinae of the family Tortricidae.

== Species ==
- Hendecaneura apicipictum Walsingham, 1900
- Hendecaneura axiotima (Meyrick in Caradja & Meyrick, 1937)
- Hendecaneura cervinum Walsingham, 1900
- Hendecaneura himalayana Nasu, 1996
- Hendecaneura impar Walsingham, 1900
- Hendecaneura rhododendrophaga Walsingham, 1900
- Hendecaneura shawiana (Kearfott, 1907)
