= Eucosma rigens =

"Eucosma" rigens

Scientific classification
- Kingdom: Animalia
- Phylum: Arthropoda
- Clade: Pancrustacea
- Class: Insecta
- Order: Lepidoptera
- Family: Tortricidae
- Subfamily: Olethreutinae
- Tribe: Eucosmini
- Genus: incertae sedis
- Species: "E." rigens

Binomial name
- "Eucosma" rigens Meyrick, 1938

Species of moth

"Eucosma" rigens is a species of moth of the family Tortricidae. It is found in the Democratic Republic of Congo.
