= Cosmetra spiculifera =

Scientific classification
- Kingdom: Animalia
- Phylum: Arthropoda
- Class: Insecta
- Order: Lepidoptera
- Family: Tortricidae
- Genus: Cosmetra
- Species: C. spiculifera

Binomial name
- Cosmetra spiculifera (Meyrick, 1913)

Synonyms
- Eucosma spiculifera Meyrick, 1913; Cosmetra anthophaga Diakonoff, 1977; Cosmetra mucronata Razowski & Wojtusiak, 2012

Species of moth

Cosmetra spiculifera is a species of moth of the family Tortricidae first described by Edward Meyrick in 1913. It is found in the Democratic Republic of the Congo, Cameroon, South Africa, Gabon, Ghana, Réunion, Mauritius and Nigeria.

This species has a wingspan of 11–14 mm, and is light ochreous with some grey suffusion along the dorsum, hindwings with blackish suffused veins.
