= Eucosma tholeropis =

"Eucosma" tholeropis

Scientific classification
- Kingdom: Animalia
- Phylum: Arthropoda
- Clade: Pancrustacea
- Class: Insecta
- Order: Lepidoptera
- Family: Tortricidae
- Subfamily: Olethreutinae
- Tribe: Eucosmini
- Genus: incertae sedis
- Species: "E." tholeropis

Binomial name
- "Eucosma" tholeropis Meyrick, 1934

Species of moth

"Eucosma" tholeropis is a species of moth of the family Tortricidae. It is found in Shanghai, China.
