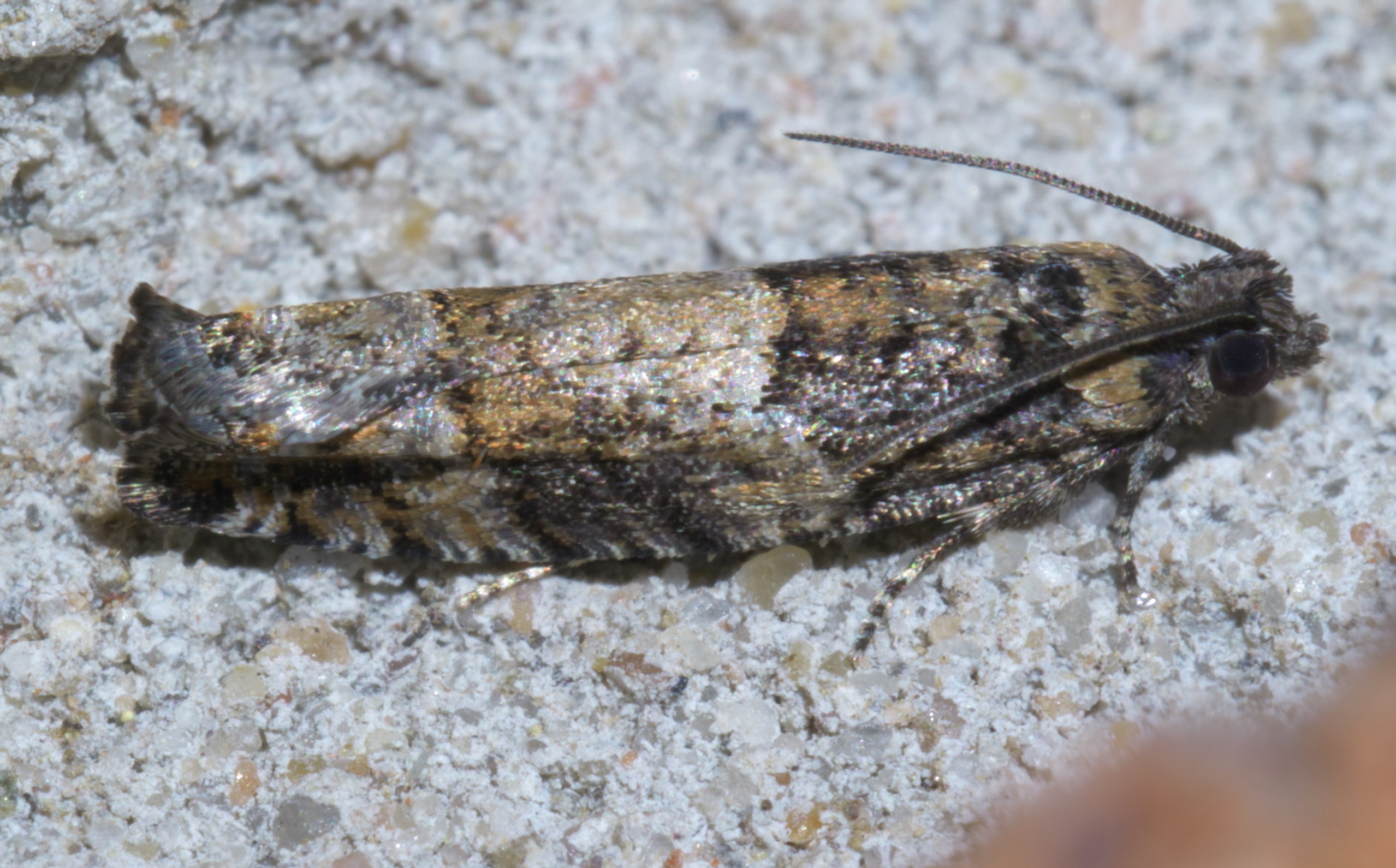
- Pseudexentera sp.

Scientific classification
- Domain: Eukaryota
- Kingdom: Animalia
- Phylum: Arthropoda
- Class: Insecta
- Order: Lepidoptera
- Family: Tortricidae
- Subfamily: Olethreutinae
- Tribe: Eucosmini
- Genus: Pseudexentera; Heinrich, 1940

= Pseudexentera =

Genus of tortrix moths

Pseudexentera is a genus of moths belonging to the subfamily Olethreutinae of the family Tortricidae.

== Species ==
- Pseudexentera costomaculana (Clemens, 1860)
- Pseudexentera cressoniana (Clemens, 1864)
- Pseudexentera faracana (Kearfott, 1907)
- Pseudexentera habrosana (Heinrich, 1923)
- Pseudexentera haracana (Kearfott, 1907)
- Pseudexentera hodsoni Miller, 1986
- Pseudexentera kalmiana McDunnough, 1959
- Pseudexentera knudsoni Miller, 1986
- Pseudexentera mali Freeman, 1942
- Pseudexentera maracana (Kearfott, 1907)
- Pseudexentera oregonana (Walsingham, 1879)
- Pseudexentera oreios Miller, 1986
- Pseudexentera senatrix (Heinrich, 1924)
- Pseudexentera sepia Miller, 1986
- Pseudexentera spoliana (Clemens, 1864)
- Pseudexentera vaccinii Miller, 1986
- Pseudexentera virginiana (Clemens, 1864)

== See also ==
- List of Tortricidae genera
