= Megaherpystis =

Scientific classification
- Kingdom: Animalia
- Phylum: Arthropoda
- Class: Insecta
- Order: Lepidoptera
- Family: Tortricidae
- Tribe: Eucosmini
- Genus: Megaherpystis; Diakonoff, 1969

Genus of tortrix moths

Megaherpystis is a genus of moths belonging to the subfamily Olethreutinae of the family Tortricidae.

== Species ==
- Megaherpystis agmatophora Diakonoff, 1989
- Megaherpystis eusema Diakonoff, 1969
- Megaherpystis melanoneura (Meyrick, 1912)

== See also ==
- List of Tortricidae genera
