= Demeijerella palleophyton =

Scientific classification
- Kingdom: Animalia
- Phylum: Arthropoda
- Class: Insecta
- Order: Lepidoptera
- Family: Tortricidae
- Genus: Demeijerella
- Species: D. palleophyton

Binomial name
- Demeijerella palleophyton Razowski, 2013

Species of moth

Demeijerella palleophyton is a species of moth of the family Tortricidae first described by Józef Razowski in 2013. It is found on Seram Island in Indonesia. The habitat consists of lowland forests, bamboo and secondary forests.

The wingspan is about 19 mm.
