= Heleanna chloreis =

Scientific classification
- Domain: Eukaryota
- Kingdom: Animalia
- Phylum: Arthropoda
- Class: Insecta
- Order: Lepidoptera
- Family: Tortricidae
- Genus: Heleanna
- Species: H. chloreis

Binomial name
- Heleanna chloreis (Turner, 1916)

Synonyms
- Acroclita chloreis Turner, 1916

Species of moth

Heleanna chloreis is a species of moth of the family Tortricidae. It is found in Australia, where it has been recorded from Queensland.

The wingspan is about 10 mm. The forewings are greenish with brownish markings, edged and mixed with dark fuscous. There are three transverse lines from the basal part of the costa up to the fold. The hindwings are pale grey.
