= Age (moth) =

Scientific classification
- Domain: Eukaryota
- Kingdom: Animalia
- Phylum: Arthropoda
- Class: Insecta
- Order: Lepidoptera
- Family: Tortricidae
- Tribe: Eucosmini
- Genus: Age; Diakonoff, 1982

Genus of tortrix moths

Age is a genus of moths belonging to the subfamily Olethreutinae of the family Tortricidae.

== Species ==
- Age arabica Kuznetzov, 1997
- Age onychistica Diakonoff, 1982

== See also ==
- List of Tortricidae genera
