= Quebradnotia =

Scientific classification
- Kingdom: Animalia
- Phylum: Arthropoda
- Class: Insecta
- Order: Lepidoptera
- Family: Tortricidae
- Tribe: Eucosmini
- Genus: Quebradnotia; Razowski & Wojtusiak, 2006

Genus of tortrix moths

Quebradnotia is a genus of moths of the family Tortricidae.

== Species ==
- Quebradnotia carchigena Razowski & Wojtusiak, 2008
- Quebradnotia chasigrapha Razowski & Wojtusiak, 2006
- Quebradnotia nolckeniana (Zeller, 1877)
- Quebradnotia ouralia Razowski & Wojtusiak, 2006
- Quebradnotia quebradae Razowski & Wojtusiak, 2006

== See also ==
- List of Tortricidae genera
