= Ustriclapex numellata =

Scientific classification
- Kingdom: Animalia
- Phylum: Arthropoda
- Class: Insecta
- Order: Lepidoptera
- Family: Tortricidae
- Genus: Ustriclapex
- Species: U. numellata

Binomial name
- Ustriclapex numellata (Meyrick, 1912)

Synonyms
- Eucosma numellata Meyrick, 1912

Species of moth

Ustriclapex numellata is a moth of the family Tortricidae. It is found in Assam, India.
