= Eucoenogenes teliferana =

Scientific classification
- Domain: Eukaryota
- Kingdom: Animalia
- Phylum: Arthropoda
- Class: Insecta
- Order: Lepidoptera
- Family: Tortricidae
- Genus: Eucoenogenes
- Species: E. teliferana

Binomial name
- Eucoenogenes teliferana (Christoph, 1882)

Synonyms
- Grapholitha teliferana Christoph, 1882

Species of moth

Eucoenogenes teliferana is a species of moth of the family Tortricidae. It is found in China (Jilin), Korea, Japan and Russia.

The wingspan is 13-14.5 mm.

The larvae feed on Corylus mandshurica.
