= Eccoptocera osteomelesana =

Scientific classification
- Domain: Eukaryota
- Kingdom: Animalia
- Phylum: Arthropoda
- Class: Insecta
- Order: Lepidoptera
- Family: Tortricidae
- Genus: Eccoptocera
- Species: E. osteomelesana

Binomial name
- Eccoptocera osteomelesana (Swezey, 1946)

Synonyms
- Epagoge osteomelesana Swezey, 1946

Species of moth

Eccoptocera osteomelesana is a moth of the family Tortricidae. It was first described by Otto Swezey in 1946. It is endemic to the Hawaiian island of Oahu.
