= Dinogenes =

Scientific classification
- Domain: Eukaryota
- Kingdom: Animalia
- Phylum: Arthropoda
- Class: Insecta
- Order: Lepidoptera
- Family: Tortricidae
- Tribe: Eucosmini
- Genus: Dinogenes; Meyrick, 1934

Genus of tortrix moths

Dinogenes is a genus of moths belonging to the subfamily Olethreutinae of the family Tortricidae.

== Species ==
- Dinogenes meteoropa Meyrick, 1934

== See also ==
- List of Tortricidae genera
