= Noduliferola anepsia =

Scientific classification
- Kingdom: Animalia
- Phylum: Arthropoda
- Class: Insecta
- Order: Lepidoptera
- Family: Tortricidae
- Genus: Noduliferola
- Species: N. anepsia

Binomial name
- Noduliferola anepsia Razowski, 2013

Species of moth

Noduliferola anepsia is a species of moth of the family Tortricidae. It is found in New Caledonia.

The wingspan is about 14 mm.
