= Alcina (name) =

Alcina is both a surname and a given name. Notable people with the name include:

== Given name ==
- Alcina Lubitch Domecq (born 1953), Israeli short story writer

== Surname ==
- Francisco Ignacio Alcina (1610–1674), Spanish historian and Jesuit missionary
- Maria Alcina (born 1949), Brazilian singer
