= Eucoenogenes ancyrota =

Scientific classification
- Kingdom: Animalia
- Phylum: Arthropoda
- Class: Insecta
- Order: Lepidoptera
- Family: Tortricidae
- Genus: Eucoenogenes
- Species: E. ancyrota

Binomial name
- Eucoenogenes ancyrota (Meyrick, 1907)

Synonyms
- Epiblema ancyrota Meyrick, 1907

Species of moth

Eucoenogenes ancyrota is a moth of the family Tortricidae. It is found in India, Sri Lanka, Japan, Korea, Burma, Thailand, western Malaysia and Brunei.

The wingspan is 18–25 mm. Adults are on wing in mid-June. In Japan, there are two to three generations per year (in June, July and August).

The larvae feed on Ternstroemia species, including Ternstroemia japonica in Korea.
