= Nuntiella extenuata =

Scientific classification
- Kingdom: Animalia
- Phylum: Arthropoda
- Class: Insecta
- Order: Lepidoptera
- Family: Tortricidae
- Genus: Nuntiella
- Species: N. extenuata

Binomial name
- Nuntiella extenuata Kuznetsov, 1971

Species of moth

Nuntiella extenuata is a species of moth of the family Tortricidae. It is found in Shaanxi, China.
