= Ustriclapex =

Scientific classification
- Kingdom: Animalia
- Phylum: Arthropoda
- Class: Insecta
- Order: Lepidoptera
- Family: Tortricidae
- Tribe: Eucosmini
- Genus: Ustriclapex; Razowski, 2009

Genus of moths

Ustriclapex is a genus of moths belonging to the subfamily Olethreutinae of the family Tortricidae.

== Species ==
- Ustriclapex numellata (Meyrick, 1912)
- Ustriclapex speculatrix (Meyrick, 1907)

== Etymology ==
The generic name is an anagram of the specific name of the type species Ustriclapex speculatrix.

== See also ==
- List of Tortricidae genera
