= Neobarbara =

Scientific classification
- Kingdom: Animalia
- Phylum: Arthropoda
- Class: Insecta
- Order: Lepidoptera
- Family: Tortricidae
- Tribe: Eucosmini
- Genus: Neobarbara; Liu & Nasu, 1993
- Species: N. olivacea

Binomial name
- Neobarbara olivacea Liu & Nasu, 1993

Monotypic genus of tortrix moths

Neobarbara is a genus of moths belonging to the family Tortricidae. It contains only one species, Neobarbara olivacea, which is found in China (Qinghai).

== See also ==
- List of Tortricidae genera
