= Eucosmophyes icelitodes =

Scientific classification
- Kingdom: Animalia
- Phylum: Arthropoda
- Class: Insecta
- Order: Lepidoptera
- Family: Tortricidae
- Genus: Eucosmophyes
- Species: E. icelitodes

Binomial name
- Eucosmophyes icelitodes Meyrick, 1913

Species of moth

Eucosmophyes icelitodes is a moth of the family Tortricidae first described by Edward Meyrick in 1913. It is found in Sri Lanka.

== Description ==
Males have a wingspan of 9 mm (0.35 in) and females have a wingspan of 9.5 mm (0.37 in). The head is pale ash grey with a dark grey vertex. Male antennae are subserrulate and pale ash grey. The pedipalps are dark grey with a pale ash-grey apex. The thorax is lighter ash grey. The abdomen is dark leaden grey in males and a lighter grey in females. The anal tuft is light ash grey and the venter is white. The forewings are pale ash grey and oblong. The forewing bears a deep blue to ash-grey basal patch. The posterior two thirds of the costa possesses six to seven black oblique marks. The apex of the forewing has a large round black spot. Female moths have a broad black subapical band on the forewing. The forewing cilia are ash grey. The hindwings are a glossy brownish grey, with darker brown to grey dusting. The hindwing cilia are light brownish grey with a darker subbasal band and a white basal line.
