= Laculataria nigroapicata =

Scientific classification
- Domain: Eukaryota
- Kingdom: Animalia
- Phylum: Arthropoda
- Class: Insecta
- Order: Lepidoptera
- Family: Tortricidae
- Genus: Laculataria
- Species: L. nigroapicata

Binomial name
- Laculataria nigroapicata Razowski & Wojtusiak, 2006

Synonyms
- Laculataria nigropicata

Species of moth

Laculataria nigroapicata is a species of moth of the family Tortricidae. It is found in Morona-Santiago Province, Ecuador.

The wingspan is about 19 mm.
