= Stygitropha =

Scientific classification
- Domain: Eukaryota
- Kingdom: Animalia
- Phylum: Arthropoda
- Class: Insecta
- Order: Lepidoptera
- Family: Tortricidae
- Subfamily: Olethreutinae
- Tribe: Eucosmini
- Genus: Stygitropha; Diakonoff, 1983

Type species
- Stygitropha funebris Diakonoff, 1983

Genus of tortrix moths

Stygitropha is a genus of moths belonging to the subfamily Olethreutinae of the family Tortricidae.

== Species ==
- Stygitropha funebris Diakonoff, 1983
- Stygitropha minys Razowski & Wojtusiak, 2013
- Stygitropha phaios Razowski & Wojtusiak, 2013

== See also ==
- List of Tortricidae genera
