= Quebradnotia carchigena =

Scientific classification
- Kingdom: Animalia
- Phylum: Arthropoda
- Class: Insecta
- Order: Lepidoptera
- Family: Tortricidae
- Genus: Quebradnotia
- Species: Q. carchigena

Binomial name
- Quebradnotia carchigena Razowski & Wojtusiak, 2008

Species of moth

Quebradnotia carchigena is a species of moth of the family Tortricidae. It is found in Carchi Province, Ecuador.

The wingspan is about 17 mm.

== Etymology ==
The species name refers to Carchi Province, where it was first found.
