= Dicnecidia =

Scientific classification
- Kingdom: Animalia
- Phylum: Arthropoda
- Class: Insecta
- Order: Lepidoptera
- Family: Tortricidae
- Tribe: Eucosmini
- Genus: Dicnecidia; Diakonoff, 1982

Genus of tortrix moths

Dicnecidia is a genus of moths belonging to the subfamily Olethreutinae of the family Tortricidae.

== Species ==
- Dicnecidia cataclasta Diakonoff, 1982
- Dicnecidia fumidana Kuznetzov, 1997
- Dicnecidia narathiwatensis Thonongtor & Pinkaew, 2025

== See also ==
- List of Tortricidae genera
