= Noduliferola neothela =

Scientific classification
- Domain: Eukaryota
- Kingdom: Animalia
- Phylum: Arthropoda
- Class: Insecta
- Order: Lepidoptera
- Family: Tortricidae
- Genus: Noduliferola
- Species: N. neothela

Binomial name
- Noduliferola neothela (Turner, 1916)

Synonyms
- Acroclita neothela Turner, 1916; Acroclita nimbata Turner, 1946

Species of moth

Noduliferola neothela is a species of moth of the family Tortricidae. It is found in Australia, where it has been recorded from Queensland.

The wingspan is 11–13 mm. The forewings are green, with scattered dark-fuscous scales and some dark-fuscous costal dots. The hindwings are pale grey.
