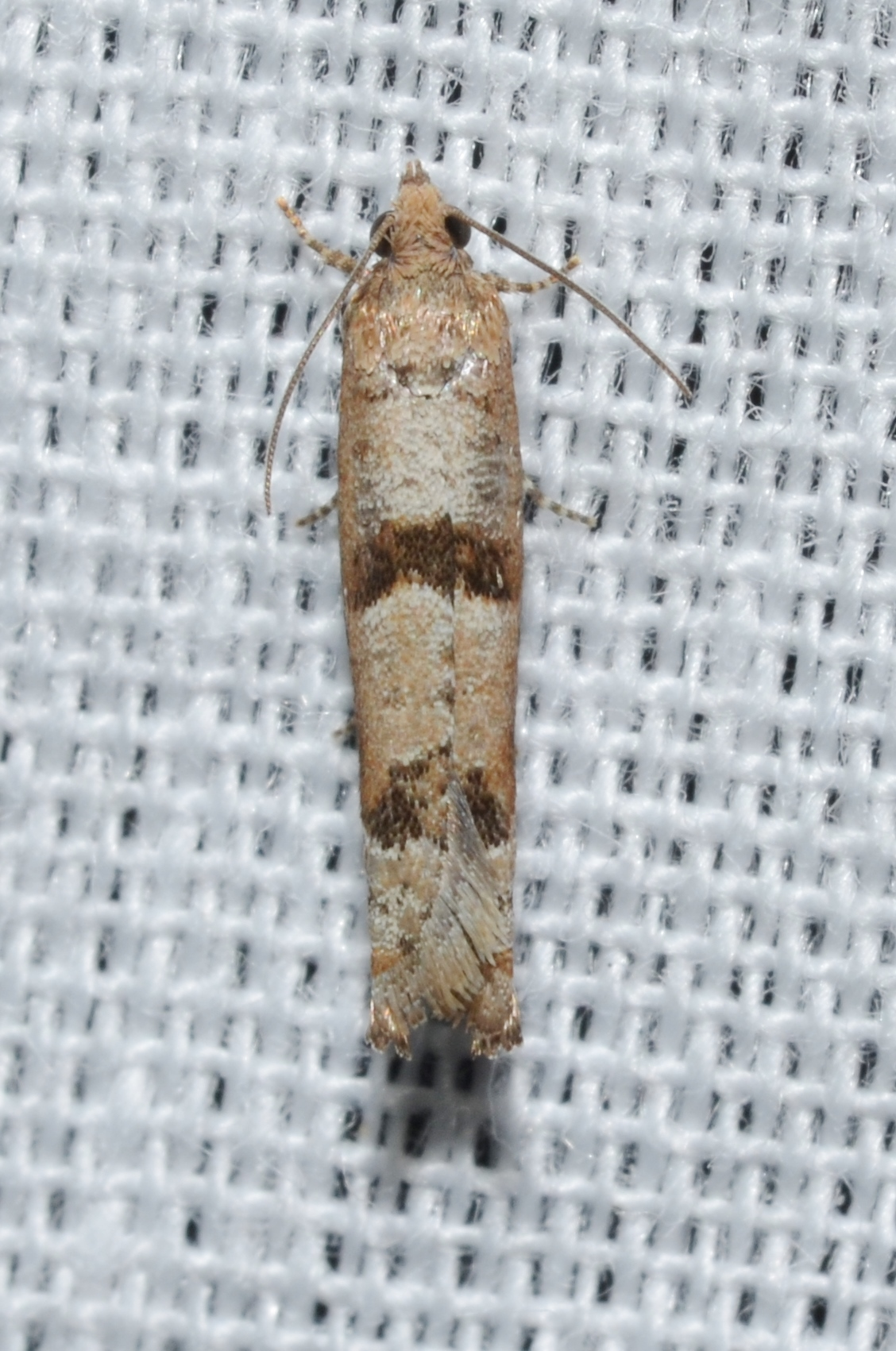

Scientific classification
- Kingdom: Animalia
- Phylum: Arthropoda
- Clade: Pancrustacea
- Class: Insecta
- Order: Lepidoptera
- Family: Tortricidae
- Genus: Pseudexentera
- Species: P. sepia

Binomial name
- Pseudexentera sepia Miller, 1986

= Pseudexentera sepia =

Species of moth

Pseudexentera sepia is a species of tortricid moth in the family Tortricidae.

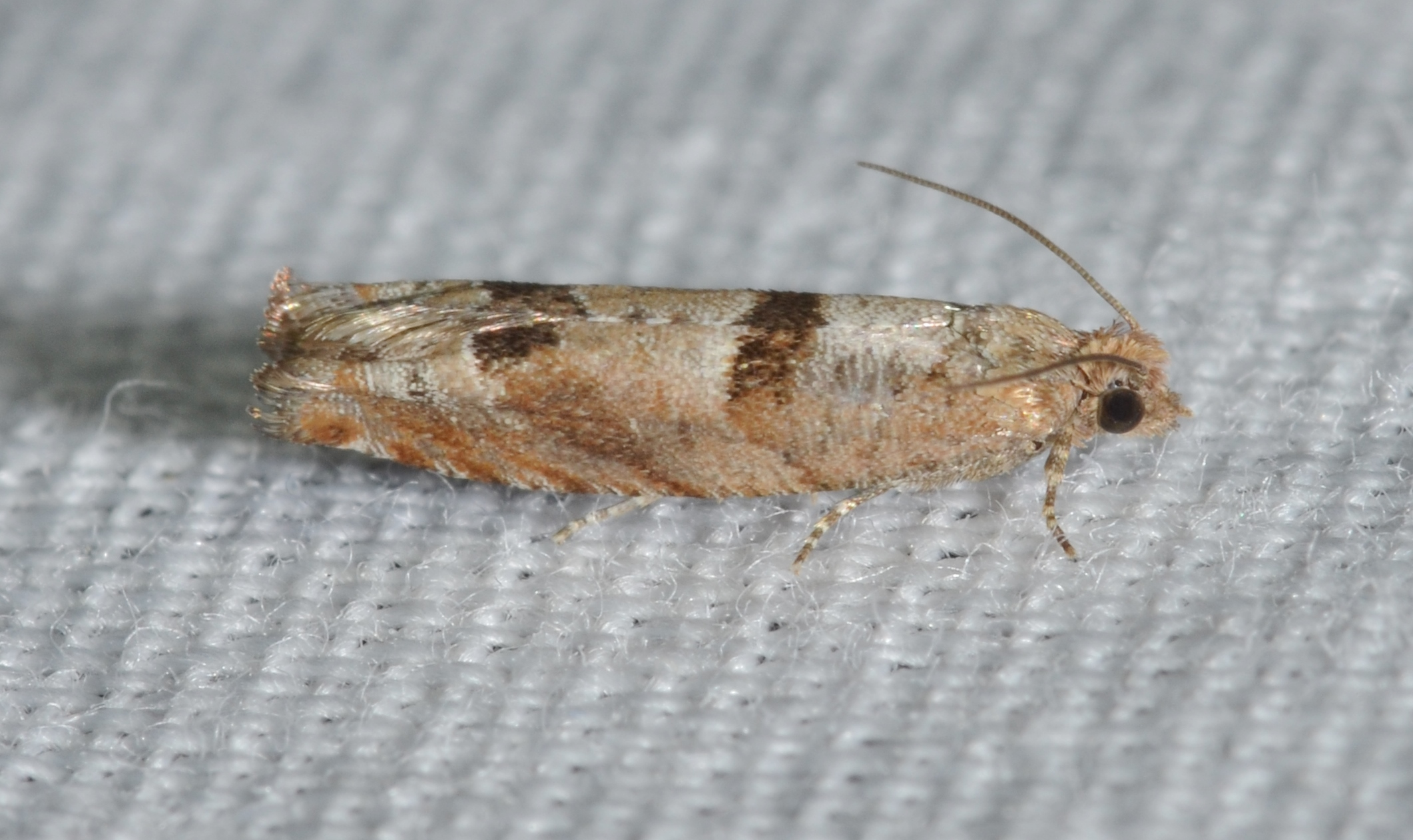
