= Heleanna =

Scientific classification
- Domain: Eukaryota
- Kingdom: Animalia
- Phylum: Arthropoda
- Class: Insecta
- Order: Lepidoptera
- Family: Tortricidae
- Tribe: Eucosmini
- Genus: Heleanna; Clarke, 1976

Genus of tortrix moths

Heleanna is a genus of moths belonging to the subfamily Olethreutinae of the family Tortricidae.

== Species ==
- Heleanna chloreis (Turner, 1916)
- Heleanna fukugi Nasu, 1999
- Heleanna melanomochla (Meyrick, 1936)
- Heleanna physalodes (Meyrick, 1910)

== See also ==
- List of Tortricidae genera
