= Acroclita macroma =

"Acroclita" macroma

Scientific classification
- Kingdom: Animalia
- Phylum: Arthropoda
- Clade: Pancrustacea
- Class: Insecta
- Order: Lepidoptera
- Family: Tortricidae
- Subfamily: Olethreutinae
- Tribe: Eucosmini
- Genus: incertae sedis
- Species: "A." macroma

Binomial name
- "Acroclita" macroma Turner, 1918

Species of moth

"Acroclita" macroma is a species of moth of the family Tortricidae. It is found in Australia, where it has been recorded from Norfolk Island.

The wingspan is about 12 mm. The forewings are green with dark-fuscous markings and several dots and some scales in the basal part of the disc. The hindwings are dark grey.
