= Age onychistica =

Scientific classification
- Kingdom: Animalia
- Phylum: Arthropoda
- Class: Insecta
- Order: Lepidoptera
- Family: Tortricidae
- Genus: Age
- Species: A. onychistica

Binomial name
- Age onychistica Diakonoff, 1982

Species of moth

Age onychistica is a moth of the family Tortricidae first described by Alexey Diakonoff in 1982. It is found in Sri Lanka, It is also found in Africa and Indonesia.

== Description ==
Sexes show slight dimorphism, with the female slightly larger than male.

Adult male wingspan is 9 mm. Head and thorax dull, pale fulvous. Vertex slightly infuscated. Palpus creamy. Short antenna thickened and pubescent. Thorax dull pale fulvous. Apex with large round black scales. Meta thorax have lateral chestnut-colored fields. Abdomen pale fulvous, with creamy venter. Forewings oblong. Costa with round base. Apex prominent and round. Forewings light fulvous with grayish dusting. Costal base slightly thickened. Beyond costa, there are 7-8 white wedge-shaped marks. Cilia pale fulvous with a narrow white basal line. Hindwings pale grayish fuscous. Cilia pale fuscous with a darker sub-basal band and a pale basal line.

Adult female wingspan is 10 mm. Ground color similar to male. Forewing with more prominent apex. Termen deep concave below apex. Forewings are bright fulvous, with pink tinge. Costal pale marks short with more distinct dark brown small wedge-shaped dots. Cilia brighter fulvous. Hindwings golden ochreous with dark brown dusting. Cilia similar to male.
