= Salsolicola =

Scientific classification
- Domain: Eukaryota
- Kingdom: Animalia
- Phylum: Arthropoda
- Class: Insecta
- Order: Lepidoptera
- Family: Tortricidae
- Tribe: Eucosmini
- Genus: Salsolicola; Kuznetzov, 1960

Genus of tortrix moths

Salsolicola is a genus of moths belonging to the subfamily Olethreutinae of the family Tortricidae.

== Species ==
- Salsolicola eremobia Falkovitsh, 1964
- Salsolicola rjabovi Kuznetzov, 1960
- Salsolicola stshetkini Kuznetzov, 1960

== See also ==
- List of Tortricidae genera
