= Eucoenogenes atripalpa =

Scientific classification
- Domain: Eukaryota
- Kingdom: Animalia
- Phylum: Arthropoda
- Class: Insecta
- Order: Lepidoptera
- Family: Tortricidae
- Genus: Eucoenogenes
- Species: E. atripalpa

Binomial name
- Eucoenogenes atripalpa Razowski, 2009

Species of moth

Eucoenogenes atripalpa is a moth of the family Tortricidae that is endemic to Vietnam.

The wingspan is 18 millimetres (0.71 in).
