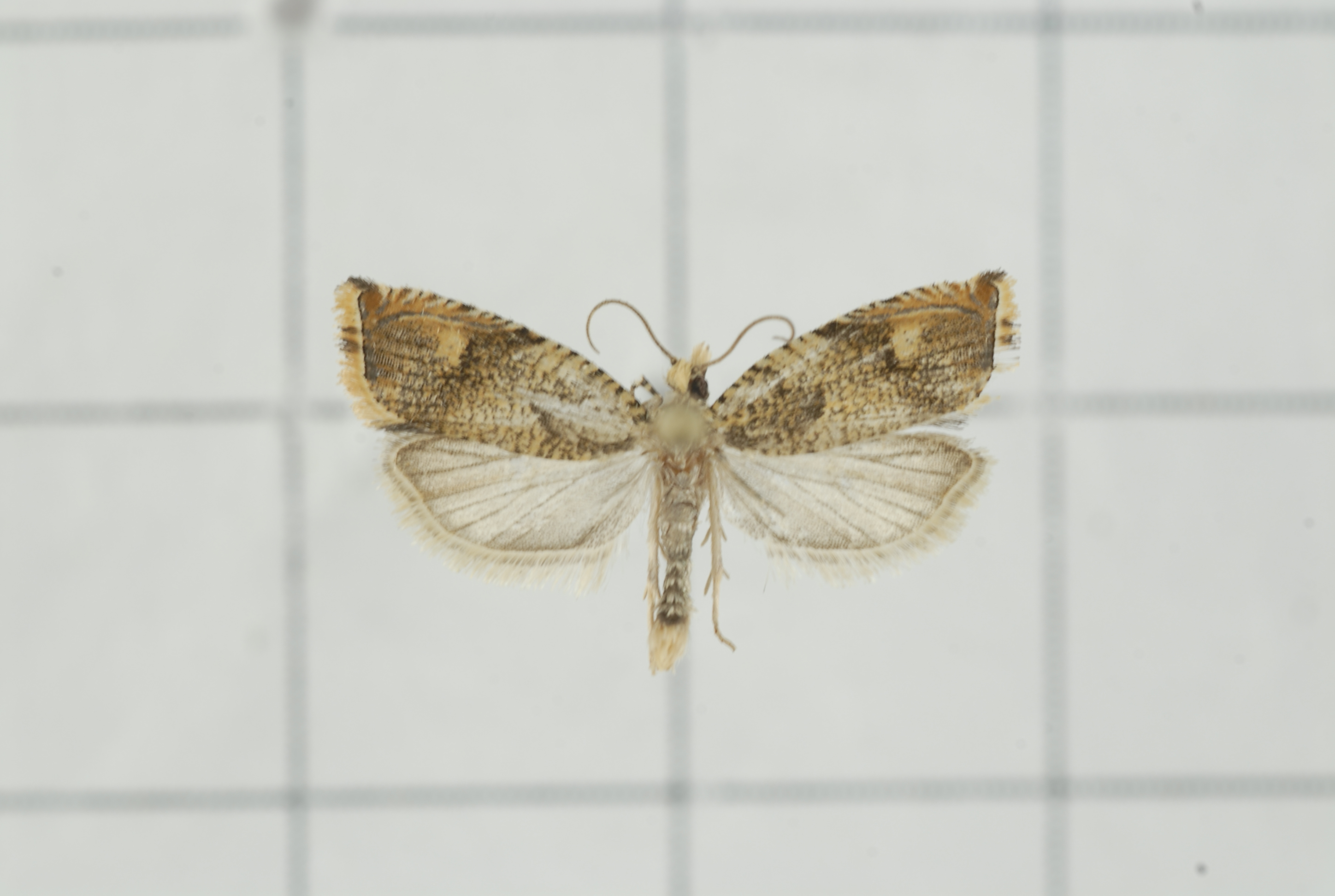

Scientific classification
- Domain: Eukaryota
- Kingdom: Animalia
- Phylum: Arthropoda
- Class: Insecta
- Order: Lepidoptera
- Family: Tortricidae
- Genus: Hermenias
- Species: H. pilushina

Binomial name
- Hermenias pilushina Razowski, 2000

= Hermenias pilushina =

Species of moth

Hermenias pilushina is a moth of the family Tortricidae. It is found in Taiwan.
