= Cosmetra =

Scientific classification
- Kingdom: Animalia
- Phylum: Arthropoda
- Class: Insecta
- Order: Lepidoptera
- Family: Tortricidae
- Subfamily: Olethreutinae
- Tribe: Eucosmini
- Genus: Cosmetra; Diakonoff, 1977

Species
- See text

Genus of tortrix moths

Cosmetra is a genus of moths belonging to the subfamily Olethreutinae of the family Tortricidae.

== Species ==
- Cosmetra accipitrina (Meyrick, 1913)
- Cosmetra anepenthes (Razowski & Trematerra, 2010)
- Cosmetra anthophaga Diakonoff, 1977
- Cosmetra brunnescens Razowski, 2014
- Cosmetra calliarma (Meyrick, 1909)
- Cosmetra fibigeri Aarvik, 2016
- Cosmetra juu Aarvik, 2016
- Cosmetra larseni Aarvik, 2016
- Cosmetra latiloba (Razowski & Trematerra, 2010)
- Cosmetra multidentata Aarvik, 2016
- Cosmetra nereidopa (Meyrick, 1927)
- Cosmetra neka Razowski & Brown, 2009
- Cosmetra podocarpivora Razowski & Brown, 2012
- Cosmetra rythmosema Diakonoff, 1992
- Cosmetra spiculifera (Meyrick, 1913)
- Cosmetra taitana Razowski & Brown, 2012
- Cosmetra thalameuta (Meyrick, 1918)
- Cosmetra truncana Aarvik, 2016
- Cosmetra tumulata (Meyrick, 1908)
- Cosmetra usumbarensis Aarvik, 2016

== See also ==
- List of Tortricidae genera
