= Kennelia tropica =

Scientific classification
- Domain: Eukaryota
- Kingdom: Animalia
- Phylum: Arthropoda
- Class: Insecta
- Order: Lepidoptera
- Family: Tortricidae
- Genus: Kennelia
- Species: K. tropica

Binomial name
- Kennelia tropica Razowski, 2009

Species of moth

Kennelia tropica is a moth of the family Tortricidae which is endemic to Vietnam.

The wingspan is 18 millimetres (0.71 in).

== Etymology ==
The name refers to the tropical area of the Oriental Region.
