= Dicnecidia cataclasta =

Scientific classification
- Kingdom: Animalia
- Phylum: Arthropoda
- Class: Insecta
- Order: Lepidoptera
- Family: Tortricidae
- Genus: Dicnecidia
- Species: D. cataclasta

Binomial name
- Dicnecidia cataclasta Diakonoff, 1982

Species of moth

Dicnecidia cataclasta is a moth of the family Tortricidae first described by Alexey Diakonoff in 1982. It is found in Sri Lanka.

The specific name cataclasta is derived from Greek, meaning "broken in pieces".

== Description ==
Males have a wingspan of 13.5 mm (0.53 in). The head and thorax are pale tawny with dark brownish-grey spots. The antennae are brownish grey with short cilia. The pedipalps are pale tawny. The thorax has four transverse, irregular dark brownish-grey bands. The abdomen is a lighter brownish grey. The forewings are pale orange to tawny with an oblong to almost ovate shape. The forewing costa are curved and the apex is obtusely rectangular. The forewings have a basal patch with four dark brown to grey wedge-shaped spots on the costal edge. The forewing has an irregular, partly interrupted median or supramedian dark brown horizontal streak. The apical part of the forewing is a slightly brighter tawny orange with a silvery gloss. The forewing cilia are dark grey with a black basal band. The hindwings are dark brownish grey with a bronze gloss. The hindwing cilia are brownish grey with a darker subbasal band and a pale ochre basal line.
