= Quebradnotia nolckeniana =

Scientific classification
- Kingdom: Animalia
- Phylum: Arthropoda
- Clade: Pancrustacea
- Class: Insecta
- Order: Lepidoptera
- Family: Tortricidae
- Genus: Quebradnotia
- Species: Q. nolckeniana

Binomial name
- Quebradnotia nolckeniana (Zeller, 1877)

Synonyms
- Grapholitha nolckeniana Zeller, 1877

Species of moth

Quebradnotia nolckeniana is a species of moth of the family Tortricidae. It is found in Colombia.
