= Laculataria =

Scientific classification
- Kingdom: Animalia
- Phylum: Arthropoda
- Class: Insecta
- Order: Lepidoptera
- Family: Tortricidae
- Tribe: Eucosmini
- Genus: Laculataria; Razowski & Wojtusiak, 2006

Genus of tortrix moths

Laculataria is a genus of moths of the family Tortricidae.

== Species ==
- Laculataria asymmetra Razowski & Wojtusiak, 2006
- Laculataria chlorochara Razowski & Wojtusiak, 2006
- Laculataria chondrites Razowski & Wojtusiak, 2006
- Laculataria nigroapicata Razowski & Wojtusiak, 2006
- Laculataria splendida Razowski & Wojtusiak, 2009

== See also ==
- List of Tortricidae genera
