= Eucoenogenes sipanga =

Scientific classification
- Domain: Eukaryota
- Kingdom: Animalia
- Phylum: Arthropoda
- Class: Insecta
- Order: Lepidoptera
- Family: Tortricidae
- Genus: Eucoenogenes
- Species: E. sipanga

Binomial name
- Eucoenogenes sipanga Razowski, 2009

Species of moth

Eucoenogenes sipanga is a moth of the family Tortricidae that is endemic to Vietnam.

The wingspan is 13.5 millimetres (0.53 in).
