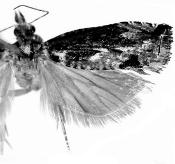
- Fibuloides aestuosa

Scientific classification
- Domain: Eukaryota
- Kingdom: Animalia
- Phylum: Arthropoda
- Class: Insecta
- Order: Lepidoptera
- Family: Tortricidae
- Tribe: Eucosmini
- Genus: Eucoenogenes; Meyrick, 1939

Synonyms
- Caenogenes Meyrick, 1937 [preoccupied]; Eucoegenes Byun & Shin, 1999

= Eucoenogenes =

Genus of tortrix moths

Eucoenogenes is a genus of moths belonging to the subfamily Olethreutinae of the family Tortricidae.

== Species ==
- Eucoenogenes ancyrota (Meyrick, 1907)
- Eucoenogenes atripalpa Razowski, 2009
- Eucoenogenes bicucullus Pinkaew, 2005
- Eucoenogenes melanancalis (Meyrick, 1937)
- Eucoenogenes sipanga Razowski, 2009
- Eucoenogenes teliferana (Christoph, 1882)
- Eucoenogenes vaneeae Pinkaew, 2005

== See also ==
- List of Tortricidae genera
