= Macraesthetica =

Scientific classification
- Kingdom: Animalia
- Phylum: Arthropoda
- Class: Insecta
- Order: Lepidoptera
- Family: Tortricidae
- Tribe: Eucosmini
- Genus: Macraesthetica; Meyrick, 1932
- Species: M. rubiginis

Binomial name
- Macraesthetica rubiginis (Walsingham in Sharp, 1907)

Synonyms
- Tortrix rubiginis Walsingham, 1907; Eulia rubiginis

Monotypic genus of tortrix moths

Macraesthetica is a monotypic moth genus belonging to the subfamily Olethreutinae of the family Tortricidae. The genus was erected by Edward Meyrick in 1932. It contains only one species, Macraesthetica rubiginis, which is only known from the Hawaiian island of Oahu. The species was first described by Lord Walsingham in 1907.

== See also ==
- List of Tortricidae genera
