= Ustriclapex speculatrix =

Scientific classification
- Kingdom: Animalia
- Phylum: Arthropoda
- Class: Insecta
- Order: Lepidoptera
- Family: Tortricidae
- Genus: Ustriclapex
- Species: U. speculatrix

Binomial name
- Ustriclapex speculatrix (Meyrick, 1907)

Synonyms
- Cydia speculatrix Meyrick, 1907; Eucosma speculatrix

Species of moth

Ustriclapex speculatrix is a moth of the family Tortricidae. It is found in the Khasi Hills of Assam, India.
