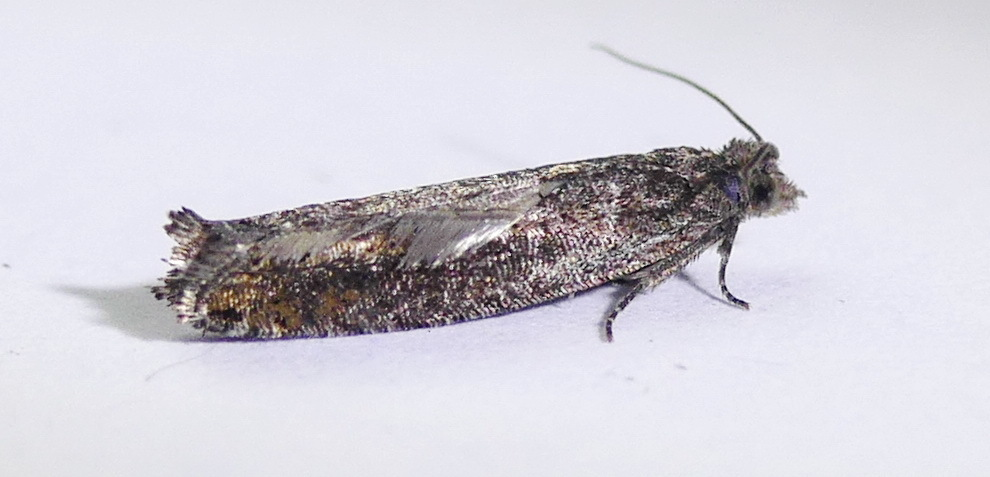

Scientific classification
- Domain: Eukaryota
- Kingdom: Animalia
- Phylum: Arthropoda
- Class: Insecta
- Order: Lepidoptera
- Family: Tortricidae
- Genus: Pseudexentera
- Species: P. mali

Binomial name
- Pseudexentera mali Freeman, 1942

= Pseudexentera mali =

Pale apple leafroller

Species of moth

Pseudexentera mali, commonly known as the pale apple leafroller or pale apple budworm, is a species of tortricid moth in the family Tortricidae.

The MONA or Hodges number for Pseudexentera mali is 3247.
