= Nuntiella lacticulla =

Scientific classification
- Kingdom: Animalia
- Phylum: Arthropoda
- Class: Insecta
- Order: Lepidoptera
- Family: Tortricidae
- Genus: Nuntiella
- Species: N. lacticulla

Binomial name
- Nuntiella lacticulla Zhang & Li, 2004

Species of moth

Nuntiella lacticulla is a species of moth of the family Tortricidae. It is found in Zhejiang and Guizhou, China.
