= Heleanna melanomochla =

Scientific classification
- Kingdom: Animalia
- Phylum: Arthropoda
- Class: Insecta
- Order: Lepidoptera
- Family: Tortricidae
- Genus: Heleanna
- Species: H. melanomochla

Binomial name
- Heleanna melanomochla (Meyrick, 1936)

Synonyms
- Acroclita melanomochla Meyrick, 1936

Species of moth

Heleanna melanomochla is a moth of the family Tortricidae. It is endemic to Taiwan.

The wingspan is 10–12 mm.
