= Melanodaedala scopulosana =

Scientific classification
- Kingdom: Animalia
- Phylum: Arthropoda
- Class: Insecta
- Order: Lepidoptera
- Family: Tortricidae
- Genus: Melanodaedala
- Species: M. scopulosana

Binomial name
- Melanodaedala scopulosana (Meyrick, 1881)

Synonyms
- Bathrotoma scopulosana Meyrick, 1881; Eucosma pachyneura Turner, 1916

Species of moth

Melanodaedala scopulosana is a species of moth of the family Tortricidae. It is found in India, Myanmar, Thailand, Vietnam, Japan, the Solomon Islands, Papua New Guinea and Australia, where it is found along the eastern coast from New South Wales to the Cape York Peninsula in Queensland.

The wingspan is about 14 mm. The forewings are pale ochreous brown, the costa strigulated (finely streaked) with dark brown. There is a dark-brown patch on the dorsum and a narrow semi-oval dark-brown patch on the dorsum before the tornus. The hindwings are semi-translucent covered with fuscous scales.

The larvae feed on Rhus semialata. They spin together the flowers of their host plant, feeding from within a silken tube.
