= Biuncaria kerzhneri =

Scientific classification
- Domain: Eukaryota
- Kingdom: Animalia
- Phylum: Arthropoda
- Class: Insecta
- Order: Lepidoptera
- Family: Tortricidae
- Genus: Biuncaria
- Species: B. kerzhneri

Binomial name
- Biuncaria kerzhneri (Kuznetzov, 1972)

Synonyms
- Asketria (Biuncaria) kerzhneri Kuznetzov, 1972

Species of moth

Biuncaria kerzhneri is a species of moth of the family Tortricidae. It is found in China (Inner Mongolia) and Mongolia.
