= Eucosma chlorosticha =

"Eucosma" chlorosticha

Scientific classification
- Kingdom: Animalia
- Phylum: Arthropoda
- Clade: Pancrustacea
- Class: Insecta
- Order: Lepidoptera
- Family: Tortricidae
- Subfamily: Olethreutinae
- Tribe: Eucosmini
- Genus: incertae sedis
- Species: "E." chlorosticha

Binomial name
- "Eucosma" chlorosticha Meyrick, 1934

Species of moth

"Eucosma" chlorosticha is a species of moth of the family Tortricidae. It is found in Liaoning, China.
