= Crimnologa =

Scientific classification
- Domain: Eukaryota
- Kingdom: Animalia
- Phylum: Arthropoda
- Class: Insecta
- Order: Lepidoptera
- Family: Tortricidae
- Tribe: Eucosmini
- Genus: Crimnologa; Meyrick, 1920

Genus of tortrix moths

Crimnologa is a genus of moths belonging to the subfamily Olethreutinae of the family Tortricidae.

== Species ==
- Crimnologa fletcheri Bradley, 1965
- Crimnologa perspicua Meyrick, 1920

== See also ==
- List of Tortricidae genera
