= Noduliferola =

Scientific classification
- Kingdom: Animalia
- Phylum: Arthropoda
- Clade: Pancrustacea
- Class: Insecta
- Order: Lepidoptera
- Family: Tortricidae
- Tribe: Eucosmini
- Genus: Noduliferola; Kuznetzov, 1973

Type species
- Noduliferola abstrusa Kuznetzov, 1973

Species
- 10, see text

Synonyms
- Duessa Clarke, 1976; Microclita Diakonoff, 1984

Genus of tortrix moths

Noduliferola is a genus of tortrix moths (family Tortricidae) belonging to the tribe Eucosmini of subfamily Olethreutinae. The known species range from East Asia to Polynesia.

At least some of them can be recognized by their hindwing veins. In these species, vein 3 and 4 are united, and approached by the fifth vein at its end.

== Species ==
- Noduliferola abstrusa Kuznetzov, 1973
- Noduliferola anepsia Razowski, 2013
- Noduliferola atriplaga (Clarke, 1976)
- Noduliferola hylica (Diakonoff, 1984)
- Noduliferola insuetana Kuznetzov, 1997
- Noduliferola marquesana (Clarke, 1986)
- Noduliferola neothela (Turner, 1916)
- Noduliferola niphada (Diakonoff, 1984)
- Noduliferola phaeostropha (Clarke, 1976)
- Noduliferola pleurogramma (Clarke, 1976)
- Noduliferola spiladorma (Meyrick, 1932)
