= Eccoptocera foetorivorans =

Scientific classification
- Domain: Eukaryota
- Kingdom: Animalia
- Phylum: Arthropoda
- Class: Insecta
- Order: Lepidoptera
- Family: Tortricidae
- Genus: Eccoptocera
- Species: E. foetorivorans

Binomial name
- Eccoptocera foetorivorans (Butler, 1881)

Synonyms
- Steganoptycha foetorivorans Butler, 1881

Species of moth

Eccoptocera foetorivorans is a moth of the family Tortricidae. It was first described by Arthur Gardiner Butler in 1881. It is endemic to the Hawaiian islands of Kauai, Oahu, Molokai, Maui, Lanai and Hawaii.

The larvae have been recorded on Cheirodendron, Metrosideros, Psidium guajava and Sysygium sandwicensis. They feed amongst webbed-together leaves.
