= Hermenias semicurva =

Scientific classification
- Kingdom: Animalia
- Phylum: Arthropoda
- Class: Insecta
- Order: Lepidoptera
- Family: Tortricidae
- Genus: Hermenias
- Species: H. semicurva

Binomial name
- Hermenias semicurva (Meyrick, 1912)

Synonyms
- Eucosma semicurva Meyrick, 1912; Spilonota semicurva

Species of moth

Hermenias semicurva is a moth of the family Tortricidae. It is found in Assam in India and in Vietnam.
