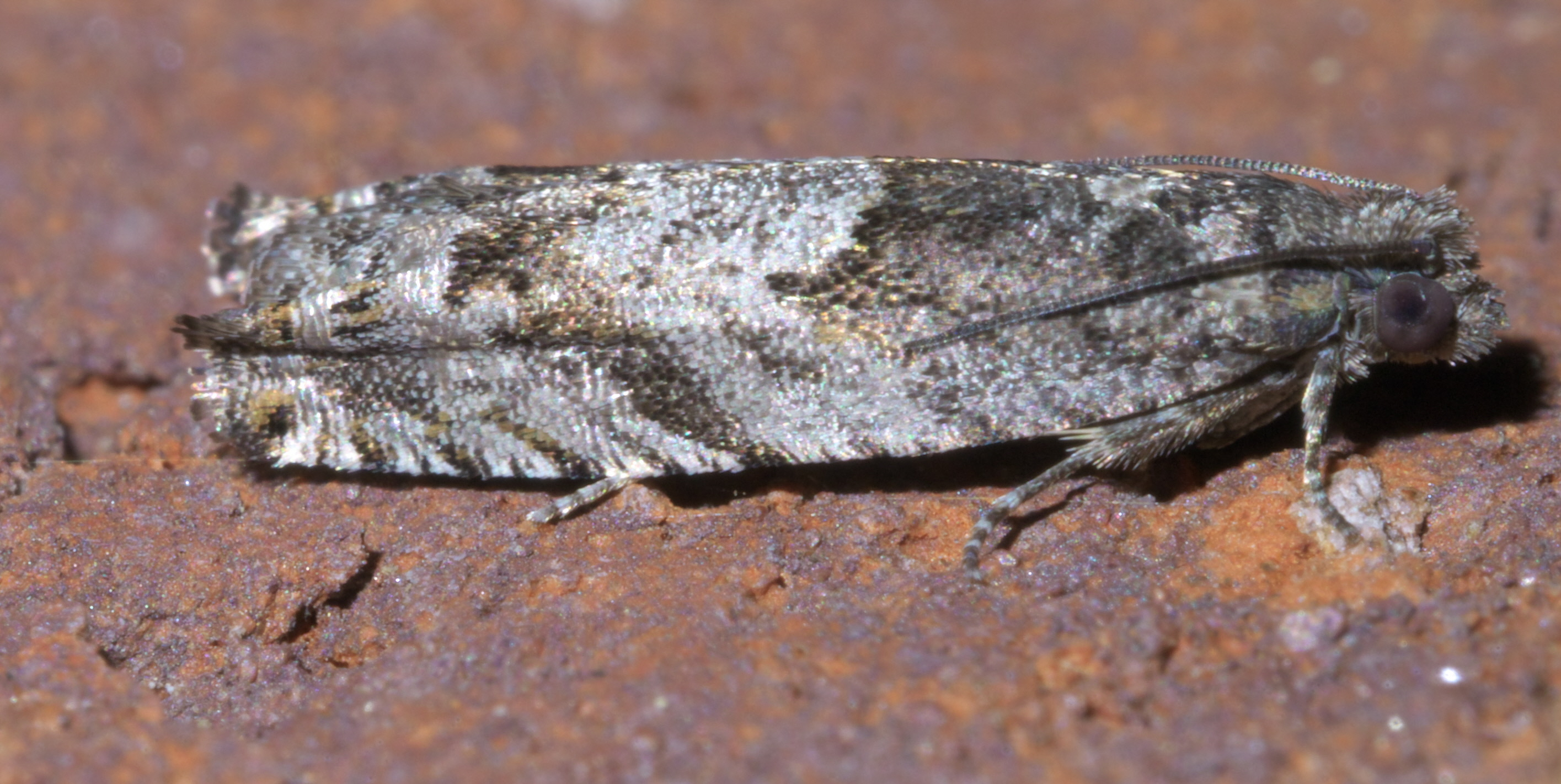

Scientific classification
- Kingdom: Animalia
- Phylum: Arthropoda
- Clade: Pancrustacea
- Class: Insecta
- Order: Lepidoptera
- Family: Tortricidae
- Genus: Pseudexentera
- Species: P. spoliana

Binomial name
- Pseudexentera spoliana (Clemens, 1864)

Synonyms
- Hedya spoliana Clemens, 1864

= Pseudexentera spoliana =

Species of moth

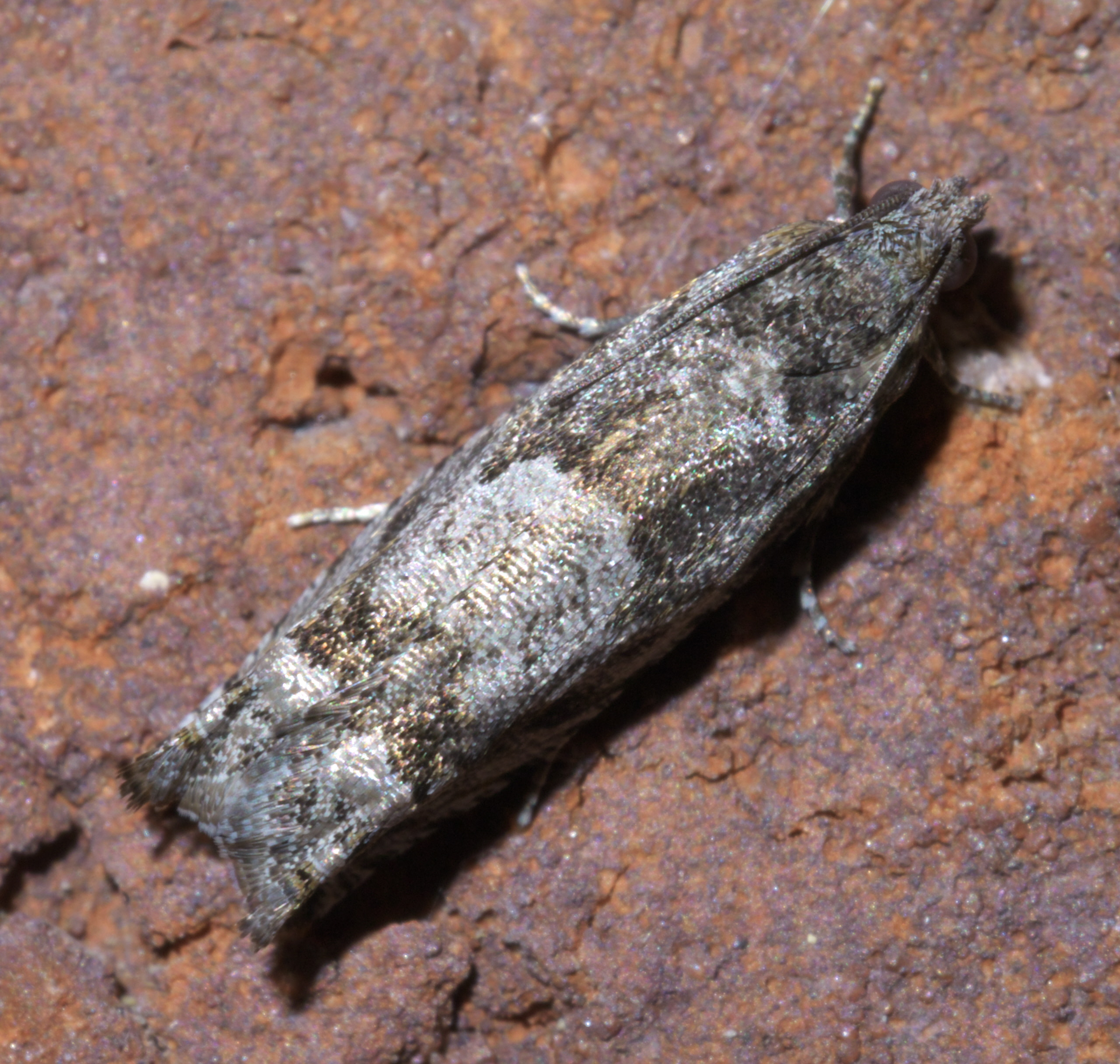
Pseudexentera spoliana, bare-patched oak leafroller, size: 8.5 mm

Pseudexentera spoliana, the bare-patched leafroller moth, is a species of moth in the family Tortricidae. It is found in the United States and southern Canada, east of the Rocky Mountains.

The wingspan is about 19 mm.

The larvae feed on Quercus species.
