= Demeijerella xanthorhina =

Scientific classification
- Domain: Eukaryota
- Kingdom: Animalia
- Phylum: Arthropoda
- Class: Insecta
- Order: Lepidoptera
- Family: Tortricidae
- Genus: Demeijerella
- Species: D. xanthorhina

Binomial name
- Demeijerella xanthorhina Diakonoff, 1954

Species of moth

Demeijerella xanthorhina is a moth of the family Tortricidae. It is only known from Papua New Guinea.
