= Noduliferola abstrusa =

Scientific classification
- Domain: Eukaryota
- Kingdom: Animalia
- Phylum: Arthropoda
- Class: Insecta
- Order: Lepidoptera
- Family: Tortricidae
- Genus: Noduliferola
- Species: N. abstrusa

Binomial name
- Noduliferola abstrusa Kuznetzov, 1973

Species of moth

Noduliferola abstrusa is a species of moth of the family Tortricidae. It is found in Jiangsu, China.
