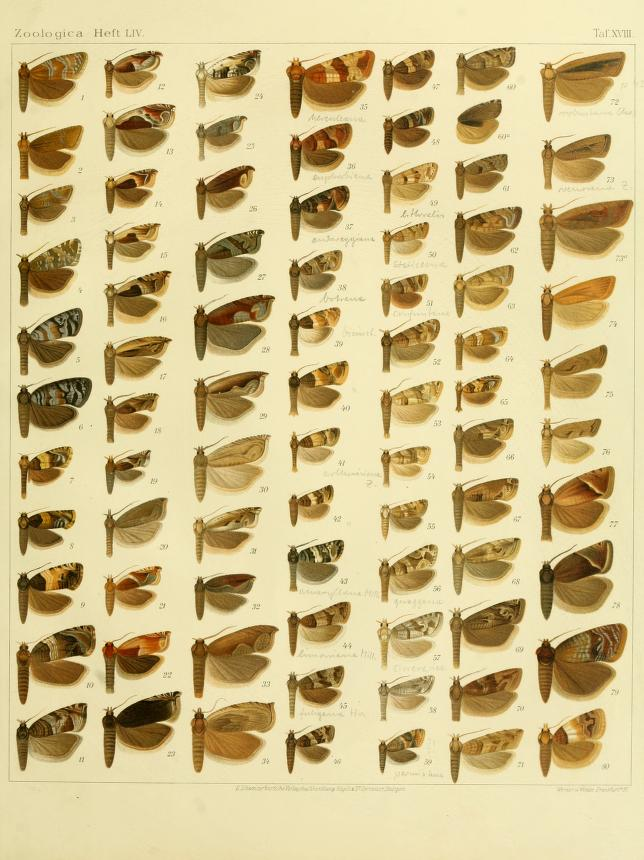
- Kennelia xylinana in Kennel Die palaearktischen tortriciden figure 34 female

Scientific classification
- Domain: Eukaryota
- Kingdom: Animalia
- Phylum: Arthropoda
- Class: Insecta
- Order: Lepidoptera
- Family: Tortricidae
- Tribe: Eucosmini
- Genus: Kennelia; Rebel, 1901

= Kennelia =

Genus of tortrix moths

Kennelia is a genus of moths belonging to the subfamily Olethreutinae of the family Tortricidae.

== Species ==
- Kennelia albifacies (Walsingham, in Swinhoe, 1900)
- Kennelia apiconcava Zhang & Wang, 2006
- Kennelia protocyma (Meyrick, 1936)
- Kennelia tropica Razowski, 2009
- Kennelia xylinana (Kennel, 1900)

== See also ==
- List of Tortricidae genera
