= Xenosocia =

Scientific classification
- Kingdom: Animalia
- Phylum: Arthropoda
- Class: Insecta
- Order: Lepidoptera
- Family: Tortricidae
- Tribe: Eucosmini
- Genus: Xenosocia; Brown, 1991

Genus of tortrix moths

Xenosocia is a genus of moths belonging to the subfamily Olethreutinae of the family Tortricidae.

== Species ==
- Xenosocia acrophora Diakonoff, 1989
- Xenosocia argyrtis Diakonoff, 1989
- Xenosocia dynastes Diakonoff, 1992
- Xenosocia euryptycha Diakonoff, 1989
- Xenosocia iocinctis Diakonoff, 1989
- Xenosocia lampouris Diakonoff, 1989
- Xenosocia panegyrica Diakonoff, 1989
- Xenosocia polyschelis Diakonoff, 1989
- Xenosocia tryphera Diakonoff, 1989

== See also ==
- List of Tortricidae genera
