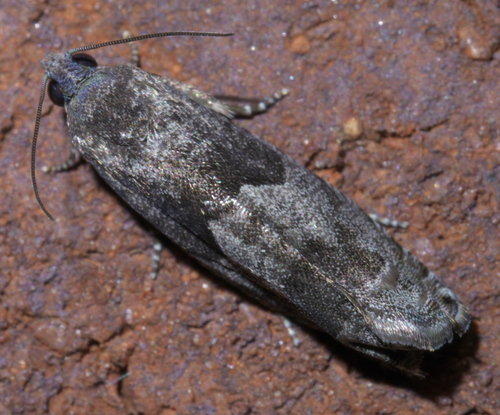

Scientific classification
- Kingdom: Animalia
- Phylum: Arthropoda
- Clade: Pancrustacea
- Class: Insecta
- Order: Lepidoptera
- Family: Tortricidae
- Genus: Pseudexentera
- Species: P. cressoniana

Binomial name
- Pseudexentera cressoniana Clemens, 1864

= Pseudexentera cressoniana =

Species of moth

Pseudexentera cressoniana, commonly known as the shagbark hickory leafroller or oak olethreutid leafroller, is a species of tortricid moth in the family Tortricidae.
