= Demeijerella =

Scientific classification
- Domain: Eukaryota
- Kingdom: Animalia
- Phylum: Arthropoda
- Class: Insecta
- Order: Lepidoptera
- Family: Tortricidae
- Tribe: Eucosmini
- Genus: Demeijerella; Diakonoff, 1954

Synonyms
- Parepisimia Diakonoff, 1975

Genus of tortrix moths

Demeijerella is a genus of moths belonging to the subfamily Olethreutinae of the family Tortricidae.

== Species ==
- Demeijerella bicolorana (Bradley, 1961)
- Demeijerella catharota (Meyrick, 1928)
- Demeijerella chrysoplea (Diakonoff, 1975)
- Demeijerella palleophyton Razowski, 2013
- Demeijerella relapsa (Meyrick, 1928)
- Demeijerella xanthorhina Diakonoff, 1954

== See also ==
- List of Tortricidae genera
