= Thylacogaster monospora =

Scientific classification
- Kingdom: Animalia
- Phylum: Arthropoda
- Class: Insecta
- Order: Lepidoptera
- Family: Tortricidae
- Genus: Thylacogaster
- Species: T. monospora

Binomial name
- Thylacogaster monospora (Meyrick, 1939)

Synonyms
- Agryroploce monospora Meyrick, 1939

Species of moth

Thylacogaster monospora is a species of moth of the family Tortricidae. It is found in the Democratic Republic of Congo and Nigeria.

The larvae feed on Garcinia ovalifolia, Garcinia xanthochymus, Allanblackia floribunda, Ricinodendron africanum and Symphonia globulifera.
