= Hendecaneura rhododendrophaga =

Scientific classification
- Kingdom: Animalia
- Phylum: Arthropoda
- Class: Insecta
- Order: Lepidoptera
- Family: Tortricidae
- Genus: Hendecaneura
- Species: H. rhododendrophaga

Binomial name
- Hendecaneura rhododendrophaga Nasu & Komai, 1997

Synonyms
- Hendecaneura rhododendrophagum

Species of moth

Hendecaneura rhododendrophaga is a species of moth of the family Tortricidae. It is found in China (Sichuan) and Japan.

The larvae feed on Rhododendron species.
