= Namasia (moth) =

Scientific classification
- Domain: Eukaryota
- Kingdom: Animalia
- Phylum: Arthropoda
- Class: Insecta
- Order: Lepidoptera
- Family: Tortricidae
- Subfamily: Olethreutinae
- Tribe: Eucosmini
- Genus: Namasia; Diakonoff, 1983

Genus of tortrix moths

Namasia is a genus of Leafroller Moths in the moth family Tortricidae. There are at least two described species in Namasia.

== Species ==
These two species belong to the genus Namasia:

- Namasia catoptrica Diakonoff, 1983 (Africa, Saudi Arabia)
- Namasia monitrix (Meyrick, 1909) (Africa)
