= Assulella =

Scientific classification
- Domain: Eukaryota
- Kingdom: Animalia
- Phylum: Arthropoda
- Class: Insecta
- Order: Lepidoptera
- Family: Tortricidae
- Tribe: Eucosmini
- Genus: Assulella; Kuznetzov, 1973

Genus of tortrix moths

Assulella is a genus of moths belonging to the subfamily Olethreutinae of the family Tortricidae.

== Species ==
- Assulella anoechtotera Diakonoff, 1983
- Assulella archaea Diakonoff, 1983
- Assulella kuznetsovi Diakonoff, 1983

== See also ==
- List of Tortricidae genera
