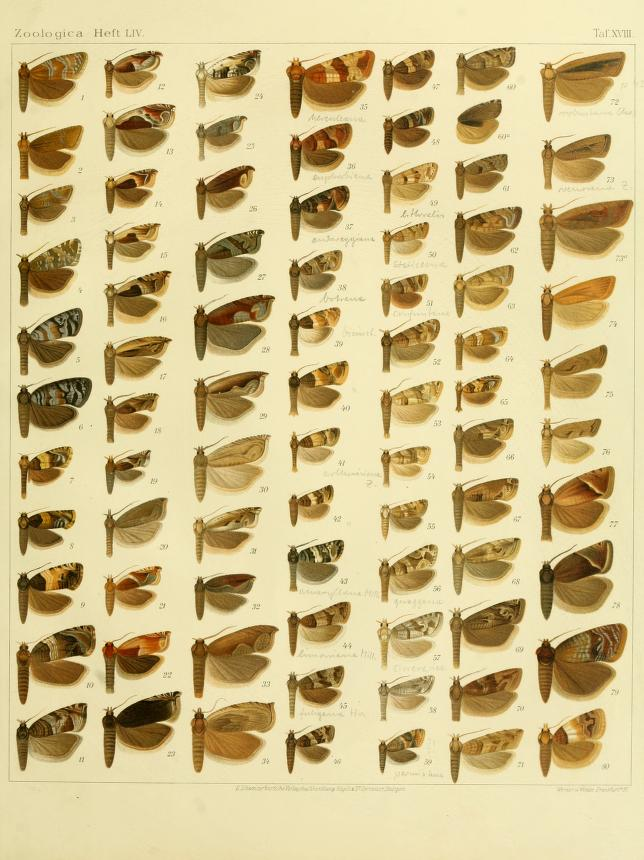
- Epibactra sareptana in Kennel Die palaearktischen tortriciden figure 75 male, 76 female

Scientific classification
- Domain: Eukaryota
- Kingdom: Animalia
- Phylum: Arthropoda
- Class: Insecta
- Order: Lepidoptera
- Family: Tortricidae
- Tribe: Eucosmini
- Genus: Epibactra; Ragonot, 1894

= Epibactra =

Genus of tortrix moths

Epibactra is a genus of moths belonging to the subfamily Olethreutinae of the family Tortricidae.

== Species ==
- Epibactra sareptana (Herrich-Schäffer, 1861)
- Epibactra usuiana Kawabe, 1976

== See also ==
- List of Tortricidae genera
