= Brachioxena sparactis =

Scientific classification
- Kingdom: Animalia
- Phylum: Arthropoda
- Class: Insecta
- Order: Lepidoptera
- Family: Tortricidae
- Genus: Brachioxena
- Species: B. sparactis

Binomial name
- Brachioxena sparactis (Meyrick, 1928)

Synonyms
- Eucosma sparactis Meyrick, 1928; Eucosma niveipalpis Meyrick, 1938; Brachioxena niveipalpis

Species of moth

Brachioxena sparactis is a species of moth of the family Tortricidae. It is found in the Democratic Republic of Congo and Uganda.
