= Emrahia =

Scientific classification
- Domain: Eukaryota
- Kingdom: Animalia
- Phylum: Arthropoda
- Class: Insecta
- Order: Lepidoptera
- Family: Tortricidae
- Tribe: Eucosmini
- Genus: Emrahia; Kocak, 1981

Genus of tortrix moths

Emrahia is a genus of moths belonging to the subfamily Olethreutinae of the family Tortricidae.

== Species ==
- Emrahia acanthis (Meyrick, 1920)
- Emrahia hoplista (Meyrick, 1927)

== See also ==
- List of Tortricidae genera
