= Nuntiella =

Scientific classification
- Kingdom: Animalia
- Phylum: Arthropoda
- Class: Insecta
- Order: Lepidoptera
- Family: Tortricidae
- Tribe: Eucosmini
- Genus: Nuntiella; Kuznetzov, 1971

Genus of tortrix moths

Nuntiella is a genus of moths belonging to the subfamily Olethreutinae of the family Tortricidae.

== Species ==
- Nuntiella angustiptera Zhang & Li, 2004
- Nuntiella extenuata Kuznetzov, 1971
- Nuntiella lacticulla Zhang & Li, 2004

== See also ==
- List of Tortricidae genera
