= Dolichurella =

Scientific classification
- Domain: Eukaryota
- Kingdom: Animalia
- Phylum: Arthropoda
- Class: Insecta
- Order: Lepidoptera
- Family: Tortricidae
- Tribe: Eucosmini
- Genus: Dolichurella; Diakonoff, 1983

Genus of tortrix moths

Dolichurella is a genus of moths belonging to the family Tortricidae.

== Species ==
- Dolichurella viridimicans Diakonoff, 1983

== See also ==
- List of Tortricidae genera
