= Heleanna physalodes =

Scientific classification
- Kingdom: Animalia
- Phylum: Arthropoda
- Class: Insecta
- Order: Lepidoptera
- Family: Tortricidae
- Genus: Heleanna
- Species: H. physalodes

Binomial name
- Heleanna physalodes Meyrick, 1926

Synonyms
- Rhopobota physalodes Meyrick, 1910; Acroclita physalodes Meyrick, 1910 (comb. nov. by Meyrick 1929: 495); Herpystis physalodes Meyrick, 1910 (comb. nov. by Diakonoff 1969: 94); Heleanna physalodes Meyrick, 1910 (comb. nov. by Clarke, 1976: 12)

Species of moth

Heleanna physalodes is a moth of the family Tortricidae first described by Edward Meyrick in 1926. It is found in the Chagos Archipelago, Sri Lanka, Guam, Micronesia and Fiji.

Larval host plants are Barringtonia, Cordia, species.

== Subspecies ==
Three subspecies are recorded.

- Heleanna physalodes abundantia Clarke, 1976
- Heleanna physalodes elitha Clarke, 1976
- Heleanna physalodes tricia Clarke, 1976
