= Eucosma pentagonaspis =

"Eucosma" pentagonaspis

Scientific classification
- Kingdom: Animalia
- Phylum: Arthropoda
- Clade: Pancrustacea
- Class: Insecta
- Order: Lepidoptera
- Family: Tortricidae
- Subfamily: Olethreutinae
- Tribe: Eucosmini
- Genus: incertae sedis
- Species: "E." pentagonaspis

Binomial name
- "Eucosma" pentagonaspis Meyrick, 1931

Species of moth

"Eucosma" pentagonaspis is a species of moth of the family Tortricidae. It is found in Taiwan.
