= Eucosma cathareutis =

"Eucosma" cathareutis

Scientific classification
- Kingdom: Animalia
- Phylum: Arthropoda
- Clade: Pancrustacea
- Class: Insecta
- Order: Lepidoptera
- Family: Tortricidae
- Subfamily: Olethreutinae
- Tribe: Eucosmini
- Genus: incertae sedis
- Species: "E." cathareutis

Binomial name
- "Eucosma" cathareutis Meyrick, 1938

Species of moth

"Eucosma" cathareutis is a species of moth of the family Tortricidae described by Edward Meyrick in 1938. It is found in the Democratic Republic of the Congo. In 2010 Józef Razowski, Leif Aarvik and Jurate De Prins wrote "The taxonomic position of this species is unknown. It is not a true member of the genus Eucosma Hübner, 1823."
