= Hendecaneura axiotima =

Scientific classification
- Kingdom: Animalia
- Phylum: Arthropoda
- Class: Insecta
- Order: Lepidoptera
- Family: Tortricidae
- Genus: Hendecaneura
- Species: H. axiotima

Binomial name
- Hendecaneura axiotima (Meyrick, 1937)

Synonyms
- Eucosma axiotima Meyrick, 1937

Species of moth

Hendecaneura axiotima is a species of moth of the family Tortricidae. It is found in China (Sichuan, Yunnan, Tibet), Taiwan, India and Nepal.
