= Hendecaneura himalayana =

Scientific classification
- Kingdom: Animalia
- Phylum: Arthropoda
- Class: Insecta
- Order: Lepidoptera
- Family: Tortricidae
- Genus: Hendecaneura
- Species: H. himalayana

Binomial name
- Hendecaneura himalayana Nasu, 1996

Species of moth

Hendecaneura himalayana is a species of moth of the family Tortricidae. It is found in China (Tibet), India and Nepal.
