= Nuntiella angustiptera =

Scientific classification
- Kingdom: Animalia
- Phylum: Arthropoda
- Class: Insecta
- Order: Lepidoptera
- Family: Tortricidae
- Genus: Nuntiella
- Species: N. angustiptera

Binomial name
- Nuntiella angustiptera Zhang & Li, 2004

Species of moth

Nuntiella angustiptera is a species of moth of the family Tortricidae. It is found in Guangxi and Yunnan, China.
