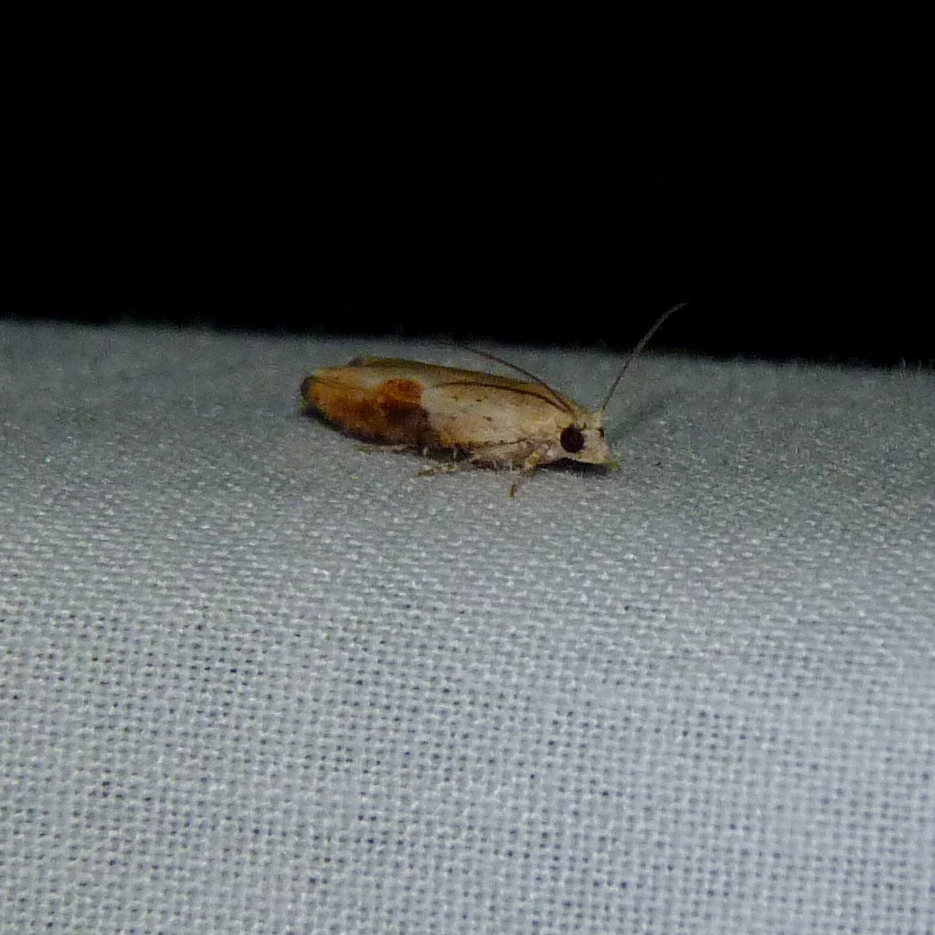

Scientific classification
- Kingdom: Animalia
- Phylum: Arthropoda
- Clade: Pancrustacea
- Class: Insecta
- Order: Lepidoptera
- Family: Tortricidae
- Genus: Pseudexentera
- Species: P. costomaculana

Binomial name
- Pseudexentera costomaculana (Clemens, 1860)

Synonyms
- Anchylopera costomaculana Clemens, 1860; Exentera costomaculana; Batodes bipustulana Walker, 1863

= Pseudexentera costomaculana =

Species of moth

Pseudexentera costomaculana is a species of moth of the family Tortricidae. It is found in North America (including Massachusetts, New York, North Carolina, South Carolina, West Virginia, Virginia, Connecticut, Maryland, Michigan, Mississippi, New Hampshire, Nova Scotia and Pennsylvania).

The wingspan is about 14 mm.

The larvae feed on Hamamelis virginiana.
