= Asketria =

Scientific classification
- Domain: Eukaryota
- Kingdom: Animalia
- Phylum: Arthropoda
- Class: Insecta
- Order: Lepidoptera
- Family: Tortricidae
- Tribe: Eucosmini
- Genus: Asketria; Falkovitsh, 1964

Genus of tortrix moths

Asketria is a genus of moths belonging to the subfamily Olethreutinae of the family Tortricidae.

== Species ==
- Asketria cervinana (Caradja, 1916)
- Asketria lepta Falkovitsh, 1964

== See also ==
- List of Tortricidae genera
