= Assulella kuznetsovi =

Scientific classification
- Domain: Eukaryota
- Kingdom: Animalia
- Phylum: Arthropoda
- Class: Insecta
- Order: Lepidoptera
- Family: Tortricidae
- Genus: Assulella
- Species: A. kuznetsovi

Binomial name
- Assulella kuznetsovi Diakonoff, 1983

Synonyms
- Assulella lithocosma Diakonoff, 1983; Eucosma litigiosa Meyrick, 1912; Eucosma litigosa Diakonoff, 1959

Species of moth

Assulella kuznetsovi is a moth of the family Tortricidae. It is found in Vietnam, India, China (Guangxi, Yunnan) and Sumatra.
