= Cosmetra tumulata =

Scientific classification
- Kingdom: Animalia
- Phylum: Arthropoda
- Class: Insecta
- Order: Lepidoptera
- Family: Tortricidae
- Genus: Cosmetra
- Species: C. tumulata

Binomial name
- Cosmetra tumulata (Meyrick, 1908)

Synonyms
- Cosmetra neka Razowski & Brown, 2009

Species of moth

Cosmetra tumulata is a species of moth of the family Tortricidae first described by Edward Meyrick in 1908. It is found in South Africa.

This species has forewing lengths of 5.2 mm, forewings weakly expanding posteriorly, ground colouration is brownish cream, partly tinged grey and suffused brownish.
