= Episimoides =

Scientific classification
- Kingdom: Animalia
- Phylum: Arthropoda
- Class: Insecta
- Order: Lepidoptera
- Family: Tortricidae
- Subfamily: Olethreutinae
- Genus: Episimoides; Diakonoff, 1957
- Species: E. erythraea

Binomial name
- Episimoides erythraea Diakonoff, 1957

Monotypic genus of tortrix moths

Episimoides is a genus of moths belonging to the subfamily Olethreutinae of the family Tortricidae.

There is only one species in this genus: Episimoides erythraea Diakonoff, 1957 that is found in La Réunion.

== See also ==
- List of Tortricidae genera
