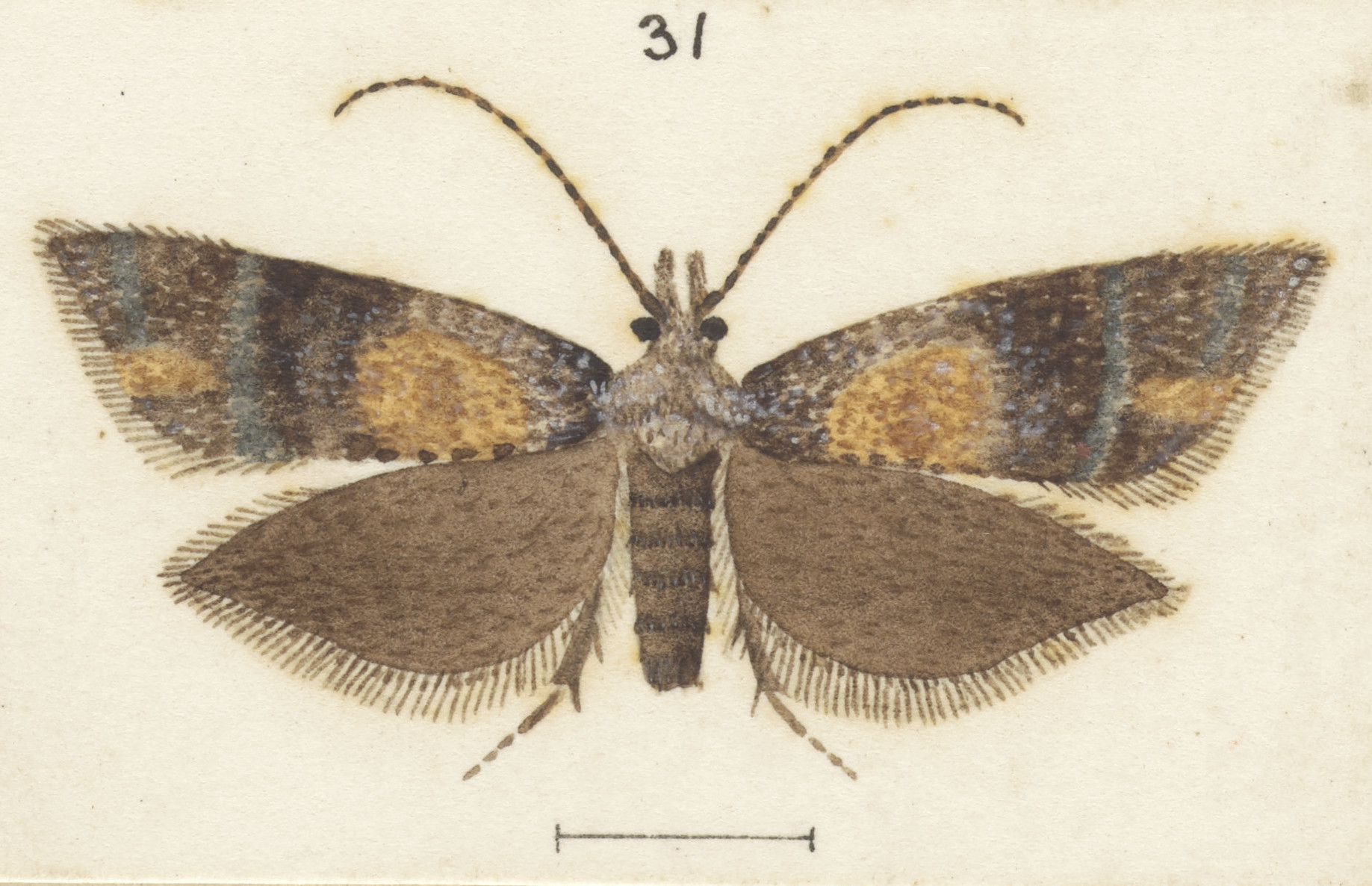
- Illustration of male H. aethaliana

Conservation status
- Data Deficit (NZ TCS)

Scientific classification
- Kingdom: Animalia
- Phylum: Arthropoda
- Clade: Pancrustacea
- Class: Insecta
- Order: Lepidoptera
- Family: Tortricidae
- Subfamily: Olethreutinae
- Genus: Hendecasticha; Meyrick, 1881
- Species: H. aethaliana

Binomial name
- Hendecasticha aethaliana Meyrick, 1881

= Hendecasticha =

Genus of tortrix moths endemic to New Zealand

Hendecasticha is a genus of moths belonging to the subfamily Olethreutinae of the family Tortricidae. This genus was described by Edward Meyrick in 1881. It consists of only one species, Hendecasticha aethaliana, which is endemic to New Zealand. This species has been observed in both the North and South Islands and inhabits damp or swampy grassland or scrub. The larval host of this species is likely grass species. Adults are on the wing from October until January. In 2025 this species was classified as "data deficient" under the New Zealand Threat Classification System by the Department of Conservation.

== Taxonomy ==
Both the genus and the species H. aethaliana were first described by Edward Meyrick in 1881. For the scientific description of H. aethaliana Meyrick used specimens collected in Hamilton on the banks of the Waikato in January. George Hudson discussed and illustrated this species in his 1928 publication The butterflies and moths of New Zealand. The lectotype specimen of the species is found at the Natural History Museum, London.

== Description ==
Meyrick described the genus Hendecasticha as follows:

Thorax smooth. Antennae in male ciliated, with an excavated notch near base. Palpi moderate, porrected, second joint densely rough-haired above and below, terminal joint nearly concealed. Posterior tibiae fringed with hairs above. Forewings elongate, narrow, costa in male with a basal fold, nearly straight, hindmargin sinuate. Hindwings elongate-trapezoidal, broader than forewings. Forewings with 11 veins, vein 7 running to costa, secondary cell indicated, upper basal fork of vein 1 nearly obsolete. Hindwings with veins 3 and 4 coincident, 5 approximated to 4 at base, 6 and 7 stalked.

Meyrick described the species H. aethaliana as follows:

♂ ♀ . 3 3/4"-4 3/4". Head, palpi, thorax, and abdomen dark fuscous, sprinkled with ashy-whitish. Antennae dark fuscous, in male notched a little above basal joint. Legs whitish-grey, all tibia; and tarsi suffusedly banded with dark fuscous-grey. Fore-wings narrow, costa hardly arched, hindmargin slightly sinuate, very oblique ; dark fuscous, coarsely irrorated with grey and ashy- whitish scales, especially on basal half and before apex, tending to form irregular transverse lines ; sometimes there is an irregular ochreous suffusion towards inner margin before middle, and above anal angle : cilia dark fuscous sprinkled at base with ashy-whitish. Hindwings dark fuscous; cilia dark fuscous, with a blackish line at base.

== Distribution and habitat ==
H. aethaliana is endemic to New Zealand. It has been observed in the North Island, including at Waimarino, as well as in the South Island, including at Mount Grey and the Takitimu Mountains. C. E. Clarke also collected this species at Maungatua in Otago and in the Takitimu Mountains in Southland. This species inhabits damp or swampy grassland or scrub. It is regarded as being a rare species.

== Behaviour ==
Adults of H. aethaliana are on the wing from October until January.

== Host species ==
The larval hosts of H. aethaliana are likely to be grass species.

== Conservation status ==
In 2025 this species was classified by the New Zealand Department of Conservation as "data deficient" under the New Zealand Threat Classification System.
