= Blastopetrova =

Scientific classification
- Kingdom: Animalia
- Phylum: Arthropoda
- Clade: Pancrustacea
- Class: Insecta
- Order: Lepidoptera
- Family: Tortricidae
- Tribe: Endotheniini
- Genus: Blastopetrova; Liu & Wu, 1987
- Species: B. keteleericola

Binomial name
- Blastopetrova keteleericola Liu & Wu, in Wu, Cao & Liu, 1987

Monotypic genus of tortrix moths

Blastopetrova is a genus of moths belonging to the subfamily Olethreutinae of the family Tortricidae. It contains only one species, Blastopetrova keteleericola, which is found in China (Guangxi, Yunnan).

The wingspan is 17–23 mm for males and 22.5–26 mm for females.

The larvae feed on Keteleeria evelyniana.

== See also ==
- List of Tortricidae genera
