= Megaherpystis melanoneura =

Scientific classification
- Kingdom: Animalia
- Phylum: Arthropoda
- Class: Insecta
- Order: Lepidoptera
- Family: Tortricidae
- Genus: Megaherpystis
- Species: M. melanoneura

Binomial name
- Megaherpystis melanoneura (Meyrick, 1912)

Synonyms
- Eucosma melanoneura Meyrick, 1912; Melanodaedala melanoneura

Species of moth

Megaherpystis melanoneura is a moth of the family Tortricidae. It is found in Japan, Korea, China (Anhui, Fujian, Shandong, Henan, Hubei, Hunan, Guangdong, Guangxi, Sichuan, Guizhou, Shaanxi), Taiwan, Thailand, India and Vietnam.
