= Allodapella =

Scientific classification
- Domain: Eukaryota
- Kingdom: Animalia
- Phylum: Arthropoda
- Class: Insecta
- Order: Lepidoptera
- Family: Tortricidae
- Tribe: Endotheniini
- Genus: Allodapella; Diakonoff, 1948

Genus of tortrix moths

Allodapella is a genus of moths belonging to the subfamily Olethreutinae of the family Tortricidae.

== Species ==
- Allodapella daemonia Diakonoff, 1948

== See also ==
- List of Tortricidae genera
