= Cirrilaspeyresia =

Scientific classification
- Domain: Eukaryota
- Kingdom: Animalia
- Phylum: Arthropoda
- Class: Insecta
- Order: Lepidoptera
- Family: Tortricidae
- Tribe: Endotheniini
- Genus: Cirrilaspeyresia; Razowski, 1961

Genus of tortrix moths

Cirrilaspeyresia is a genus of moths belonging to the subfamily Olethreutinae of the family Tortricidae.

== Species ==
- Cirrilaspeyresia imbecillana (Kennel, 1901)
- Cirrilaspeyresia taeniosana (Chrtien, 1915)

== See also ==
- List of Tortricidae genera
