= Alischirnevalia =

Scientific classification
- Domain: Eukaryota
- Kingdom: Animalia
- Phylum: Arthropoda
- Class: Insecta
- Order: Lepidoptera
- Family: Tortricidae
- Tribe: Endotheniini
- Genus: Alischirnevalia; Kocak, 1981

Genus of tortrix moths

Alischirnevalia is a genus of moths belonging to the subfamily Tortricinae of the family Tortricidae.

== Species ==
- Alischirnevalia callirrhoa (Meyrick, 1911)

== See also ==
- List of Tortricidae genera
