= Bipartivalva =

Scientific classification
- Domain: Eukaryota
- Kingdom: Animalia
- Phylum: Arthropoda
- Class: Insecta
- Order: Lepidoptera
- Family: Tortricidae
- Tribe: Endotheniini
- Genus: Bipartivalva; Kuznetzov, 1988

Genus of tortrix moths

Bipartivalva is a genus of moths belonging to the subfamily Olethreutinae of the family Tortricidae.

== Species ==
- Bipartivalva aquilana Kuznetzov, 1988
- Bipartivalva eurypinax (Meyrick in Caradja & Meyrick, 1937)

== See also ==
- List of Tortricidae genera
