= Whittenella =

Scientific classification
- Kingdom: Animalia
- Phylum: Arthropoda
- Class: Insecta
- Order: Lepidoptera
- Family: Tortricidae
- Subfamily: Olethreutinae
- Genus: Whittenella; Horak, 2006

Genus of tortrix moths

Whittenella is a genus of moths of the family Tortricidae containing the sole species Whittenella peltosema.

== See also ==
- List of Tortricidae genera
