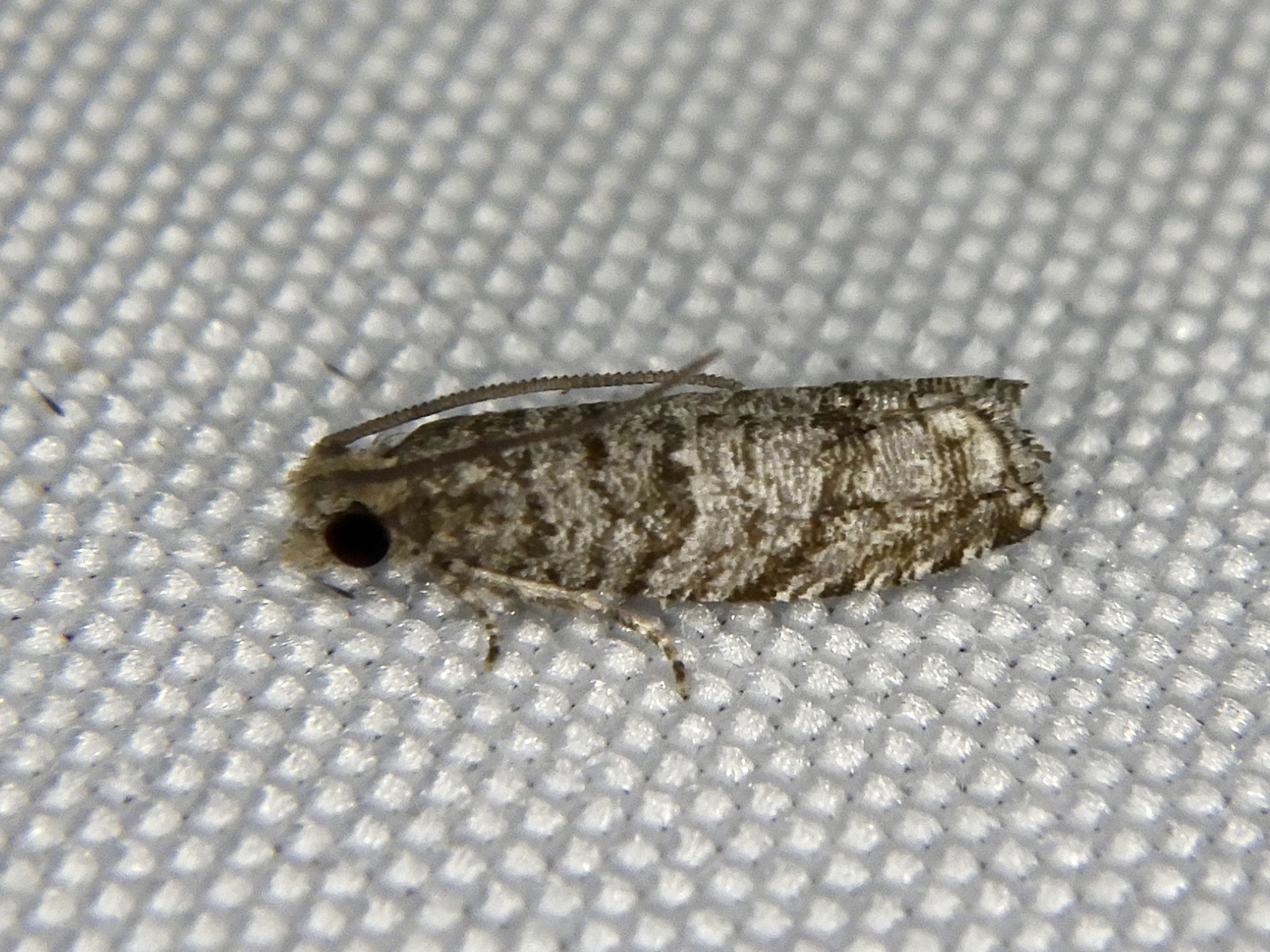

Scientific classification
- Missing taxonomy template (fix): Metacosma

= Metacosma =

Genus of tortrix moths

Metacosma is a genus of moths belonging to the subfamily Olethreutinae of the family Tortricidae.

== Species ==
- Metacosma impolitana Kuznetzov, 1985
- Metacosma miratorana Kuznetzov, 1988

== See also ==
- List of Tortricidae genera
