= Biuncaria =

Scientific classification
- Domain: Eukaryota
- Kingdom: Animalia
- Phylum: Arthropoda
- Class: Insecta
- Order: Lepidoptera
- Family: Tortricidae
- Tribe: Endotheniini
- Genus: Biuncaria; Kuznetzov, 1972

Genus of tortrix moths

Biuncaria is a genus of moths belonging to the family Tortricidae.

== Species ==
- Biuncaria kenteana (Staudinger, 1892)
- Biuncaria kerzhneri (Kuznetzov, 1972)

== See also ==
- List of Tortricidae genera
