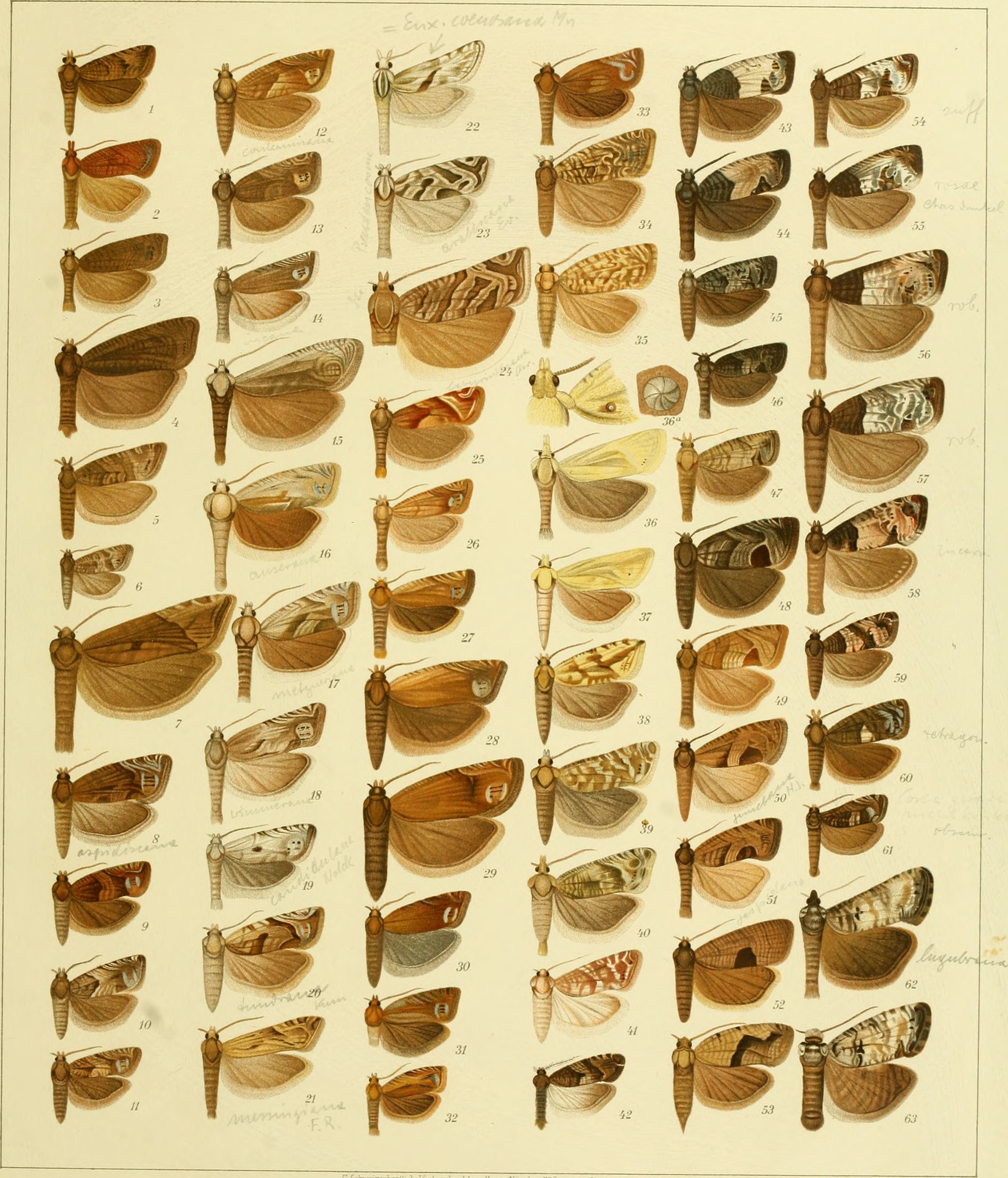
- Thiodiodes seeboldi in Kennel Die palaearktischen tortriciden figure 5 female

Scientific classification
- Kingdom: Animalia
- Phylum: Arthropoda
- Class: Insecta
- Order: Lepidoptera
- Family: Tortricidae
- Subfamily: Olethreutinae
- Genus: Thiodiodes; Obraztsov, 1964

= Thiodiodes =

Genus of tortrix moths

Thiodiodes is a genus of moths belonging to the subfamily Olethreutinae of the family Tortricidae.

== Species ==
- Thiodiodes seeboldi (Rossler, 1877)

== See also ==
- List of Tortricidae genera
