= Penestostoma =

Scientific classification
- Kingdom: Animalia
- Phylum: Arthropoda
- Class: Insecta
- Order: Lepidoptera
- Family: Tortricidae
- Subfamily: Olethreutinae
- Genus: Penestostoma; Diakonoff, 1992

Genus of tortrix moths

Penestostoma is a genus of moths belonging to the subfamily Olethreutinae of the family Tortricidae.

== Species ==
- Penestostoma compsa Diakonoff, 1992

== See also ==
- List of Tortricidae genera
