= Brachiocera =

Scientific classification
- Domain: Eukaryota
- Kingdom: Animalia
- Phylum: Arthropoda
- Class: Insecta
- Order: Lepidoptera
- Family: Tortricidae
- Tribe: Endotheniini
- Genus: Brachiocera; Diakonoff, 1959

Genus of tortrix moths

Brachiocera is a genus of moths belonging to the subfamily Olethreutinae of the family Tortricidae.

== Species ==
- Brachiocera gonioptera(Diakonoff, 1959)

== See also ==
- List of Tortricidae genera
