= Anoecophysis =

Scientific classification
- Domain: Eukaryota
- Kingdom: Animalia
- Phylum: Arthropoda
- Class: Insecta
- Order: Lepidoptera
- Family: Tortricidae
- Tribe: Endotheniini
- Genus: Anoecophysis; Diakonoff, 1983

Genus of tortrix moths

Anoecophysis is a genus of moths belonging to family Tortricidae, with a single species found in Borneo and Pulo Laut.

== Species ==
- Anoecophysis branchiodes (Meyrick, 1910)

== See also ==
- List of Tortricidae genera
