= Thylacogaster =

Scientific classification
- Domain: Eukaryota
- Kingdom: Animalia
- Phylum: Arthropoda
- Class: Insecta
- Order: Lepidoptera
- Family: Tortricidae
- Subfamily: Olethreutinae
- Genus: Thylacogaster; Diakonoff, 1988

Genus of tortrix moths

Thylacogaster is a genus of moths belonging to the family Tortricidae.

== Species ==
- Thylacogaster cyanophaea (Meyrick, 1927)
- Thylacogaster monospora (Meyrick, 1939)
- Thylacogaster rhodomenia Diakonoff, 1988

== See also ==
- List of Tortricidae genera
