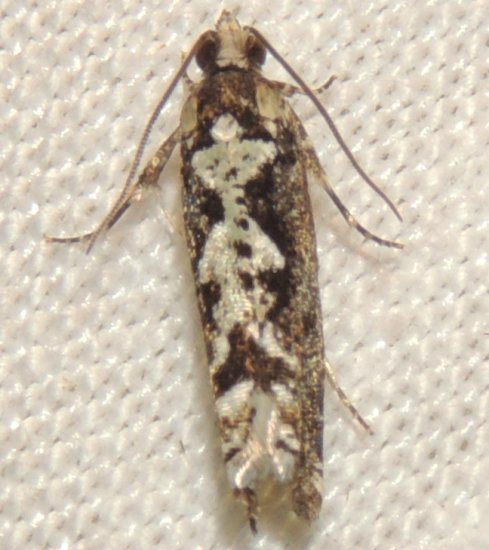
- Chimoptesis pennsylvaniana

Scientific classification
- Kingdom: Animalia
- Phylum: Arthropoda
- Clade: Pancrustacea
- Class: Insecta
- Order: Lepidoptera
- Family: Tortricidae
- Subfamily: Olethreutinae
- Genus: Chimoptesis; Powell, 1964

= Chimoptesis =

Genus of tortrix moths

Chimoptesis is a genus of moths belonging to the subfamily Olethreutinae of the family Tortricidae.

== Species ==
- Chimoptesis chrysopyla Powell, 1964
- Chimoptesis gerulae (Heinrich, 1923)
- Chimoptesis matheri Powell, 1964
- Chimoptesis pennsylvaniana (Kearfott, 1907)

== See also ==
- List of Tortricidae genera
