= Azuayacana =

Scientific classification
- Domain: Eukaryota
- Kingdom: Animalia
- Phylum: Arthropoda
- Class: Insecta
- Order: Lepidoptera
- Family: Tortricidae
- Tribe: Endotheniini
- Genus: Azuayacana; Razowski, 1999

Genus of tortrix moths

Azuayacana is a genus of moths belonging to family Tortricidae, with a single species found in Ecuador.

== Species ==
- Azuayacana cidnochroa Razowski, 1999

== See also ==
- List of Tortricidae genera
