= Plutographa =

Scientific classification
- Kingdom: Animalia
- Phylum: Arthropoda
- Class: Insecta
- Order: Lepidoptera
- Family: Tortricidae
- Subfamily: Olethreutinae
- Genus: Plutographa; Diakonoff, 1970

Genus of tortrix moths

Plutographa is a genus of moths belonging to the subfamily Olethreutinae of the family Tortricidae.

== Species ==
- Plutographa anopa Diakonoff, 1989
- Plutographa authodes Diakonoff, 1992
- Plutographa brochota Diakonoff, 1989
- Plutographa cryphaea Diakonoff, 1989
- Plutographa cyanea Diakonoff, 1989
- Plutographa cyclops Diakonoff, 1970
- Plutographa dyspotma Diakonoff, 1989
- Plutographa erytema Diakonoff, 1989
- Plutographa eudela Diakonoff, 1989
- Plutographa glochydosema Diakonoff, 1989
- Plutographa heteranthera Diakonoff, 1970
- Plutographa latefracta Diakonoff, 1989
- Plutographa lichenophyes Diakonoff, 1989
- Plutographa microsarca Diakonoff, 1989
- Plutographa monopa Diakonoff, 1989
- Plutographa nigrivittata Diakonoff, 1989
- Plutographa orbiculi Diakonoff, 1989
- Plutographa phloena Diakonoff, 1989
- Plutographa phloeorrhages (Diakonoff, 1970)
- Plutographa pictura (Diakonoff, 1970)
- Plutographa reducta Diakonoff, 1989
- Plutographa rhodana Diakonoff, 1989
- Plutographa semna Diakonoff, 1989
- Plutographa seriopa Diakonoff, 1989
- Plutographa spodostoma Diakonoff, 1989
- Plutographa tetracelis Diakonoff, 1989
- Plutographa tomion Diakonoff, 1989
- Plutographa transversa (Diakonoff, 1970)
- Plutographa xyloglypha Diakonoff, 1989

== See also ==
- List of Tortricidae genera
