= Alcina Lubitch Domecq =

Israeli short story writer (born 1953)

- Native name: אלצ'ינה לוביץ' דומק
- Born: 1953 (age 71–72); Guatemala
- Occupation: Short story writer

Alcina Lubitch Domecq (Hebrew: אלצ'ינה לוביץ' דומק; born 1953) is an Israeli short story writer. She was born in Guatemala to an Auschwitz survivor father, and an Iberian-Guatemalan mother. After her parents' divorced, she moved to Mexico in the sixties and left in the early 1970s. After a stay in Europe, she made aliyah to Israel where she now works as a janitor in a Haifa hospital. Her works include The Mirror's Mirror: or, The Noble Smile of the Dog (1983) and Intoxicada (1984); she has had short stories, focusing mainly on the Jewish condition, published in many anthologies.
