= Collogenes =

Scientific classification
- Domain: Eukaryota
- Kingdom: Animalia
- Phylum: Arthropoda
- Class: Insecta
- Order: Lepidoptera
- Family: Tortricidae
- Tribe: Endotheniini
- Genus: Collogenes; Meyrick, 1931

Genus of tortrix moths

Collogenes is a genus of moths belonging to the subfamily Olethreutinae of the family Tortricidae.

== Species ==
- Collogenes albocingulata Horak, 2006
- Collogenes dascia (Bradley, 1962)
- Collogenes loricata (Diakonoff, 1959)
- Collogenes percnophylla Meyrick, 1931
- Collogenes plumbosa Diakonoff, 1959
- Collogenes pseuta Diakonoff, 1959
- Collogenes squamosa (Diakonoff, 1959)

== See also ==
- List of Tortricidae genera
