= Mystogenes =

Scientific classification
- Kingdom: Animalia
- Phylum: Arthropoda
- Class: Insecta
- Order: Lepidoptera
- Family: Tortricidae
- Genus: Mystogenes
- Species: M. statopa

Binomial name
- Mystogenes statopa Meyrick, 1930

Genus of tortrix moths

Mystogenes is a genus of moths belonging to the subfamily Olethreutinae of the family Tortricidae.

== Description ==
This genus presently only contains one species Mystogenes astatopa Meyrick, 1930 described from Mauritius that has a wingspan of 12mm.

== See also ==
- List of Tortricidae genera
