= Herpystostena =

Scientific classification
- Kingdom: Animalia
- Phylum: Arthropoda
- Class: Insecta
- Order: Lepidoptera
- Family: Tortricidae
- Subfamily: Olethreutinae
- Genus: Herpystostena; Diakonoff, 1984

Genus of tortrix moths

Herpystostena is a genus of moths belonging to the family Tortricidae.

== Species ==
- Herpystostena sicaria (Diakonoff, 1982)

== See also ==
- List of Tortricidae genera
