= Charitostega =

Scientific classification
- Domain: Eukaryota
- Kingdom: Animalia
- Phylum: Arthropoda
- Class: Insecta
- Order: Lepidoptera
- Family: Tortricidae
- Tribe: Endotheniini
- Genus: Charitostega; Diakonoff, 1988

Genus of tortrix moths

Charitostega is a genus of moths belonging to the family Tortricidae.

== Species ==
- Charitostega poliocycla Diakonoff, 1988

== See also ==
- List of Tortricidae genera
