= Brachioxena =

Scientific classification
- Domain: Eukaryota
- Kingdom: Animalia
- Phylum: Arthropoda
- Class: Insecta
- Order: Lepidoptera
- Family: Tortricidae
- Tribe: Endotheniini
- Genus: Brachioxena; Diakonoff, 1968

Genus of tortrix moths

Brachioxena is a genus of moths belonging to the subfamily Olethreutinae of the family Tortricidae.

== Species ==
- Brachioxena lutrocopa (Meyrick, 1914)
- Brachioxena niveipalpis (Meyrick, 1938)
- Brachioxena pakistanella (Amsel, 1968)
- Brachioxena psammacta (Meyrick, 1908)
- Brachioxena sparactis (Meyrick, 1928)

== See also ==
- List of Tortricidae genera
