= Eccoptocera =

Scientific classification
- Kingdom: Animalia
- Phylum: Arthropoda
- Clade: Pancrustacea
- Class: Insecta
- Order: Lepidoptera
- Family: Tortricidae
- Tribe: Eucosmini
- Genus: Eccoptocera; Walsingham, 1907

Synonyms
- Alcina Clarke, 1976

Genus of tortrix moths

Eccoptocera is a genus of moths belonging to the subfamily Olethreutinae of the family Tortricidae.

== Species ==
- Eccoptocera australis Horak, 2006
- Eccoptocera foetorivorans (Butler, 1881)
- Eccoptocera hinanohomauna Austin & Rubinoff, 2023
- Eccoptocera implexa (Meyrick, 1912)
- Eccoptocera iwipookua Austin & Rubinoff, 2024
- Eccoptocera kualii Austin & Rubinoff, 2024
- Eccoptocera kukona Austin & Rubinoff, 2024
- Eccoptocera ohiaha Austin & Rubinoff, 2023
- Eccoptocera osteomelesana (Swezey, 1946)
- Eccoptocera palmicola (Meyrick, 1912)
- Eccoptocera stenotes (Clarke, 1976)

== See also ==
- List of Tortricidae genera
