= Eucosmophyes =

Scientific classification
- Kingdom: Animalia
- Phylum: Arthropoda
- Class: Insecta
- Order: Lepidoptera
- Family: Tortricidae
- Subfamily: Olethreutinae
- Genus: Eucosmophyes; Diakonoff, 1982

Genus of moths

Eucosmophyes is a genus of moths belonging to the subfamily Olethreutinae of the family Tortricidae.

== Species ==
- Eucosmophyes commoni Horak, 2006
- Eucosmophyes icelitodes Diakonoff, 1982

== See also ==
- List of Tortricidae genera
