= Parachanda =

Scientific classification
- Kingdom: Animalia
- Phylum: Arthropoda
- Class: Insecta
- Order: Lepidoptera
- Family: Tortricidae
- Subfamily: Olethreutinae
- Genus: Parachanda; Meyrick, 1927

Genus of tortrix moths

Parachanda is a genus of moths belonging to the subfamily Olethreutinae of the family Tortricidae.

== Species ==
- Parachanda phantastis Meyrick, 1927
- Parachanda polycosma Meyrick, 1930

== See also ==
- List of Tortricidae genera
