= Hermenias =

Scientific classification
- Domain: Eukaryota
- Kingdom: Animalia
- Phylum: Arthropoda
- Class: Insecta
- Order: Lepidoptera
- Family: Tortricidae
- Subfamily: Olethreutinae
- Tribe: Eucosmini
- Genus: Hermenias; Meyrick, 1911

Genus of tortrix moths

Hermenias is a genus of moths belonging to the subfamily Olethreutinae of the family Tortricidae.

== Species ==
- Hermenias dnophera Dianokoff, 1983
- Hermenias epidola Meyrick, 1911
- Hermenias pachnitis Meyrick, 1912
- Hermenias pilushina Razowski, 2000
- Hermenias rivulifera Turner, 1946
- Hermenias semicurva (Meyrick, 1912)
- Hermenias zygodelta Meyrick, 1938

== See also ==
- List of Tortricidae genera
