= Heterochorista prisca =

Scientific classification
- Domain: Eukaryota
- Kingdom: Animalia
- Phylum: Arthropoda
- Class: Insecta
- Order: Lepidoptera
- Family: Tortricidae
- Genus: Heterochorista
- Species: H. prisca

Binomial name
- Heterochorista prisca Horak, 1984

Species of moth

Heterochorista prisca is a species of moth of the family Tortricidae. It is found in Papua New Guinea.
