= Cyphophanes =

Scientific classification
- Domain: Eukaryota
- Kingdom: Animalia
- Phylum: Arthropoda
- Class: Insecta
- Order: Lepidoptera
- Family: Tortricidae
- Tribe: Enarmoniini
- Genus: Cyphophanes; Meyrick, 1937

Genus of tortrix moths

Cyphophanes is a genus of moths belonging to the subfamily Olethreutinae of the family Tortricidae.

== Species ==
- Cyphophanes dryocoma (Meyrick, 1916)
- Cyphophanes dyscheranta Meyrick, 1937
- Cyphophanes gracilivalva Horak, 2006
- Cyphophanes khitchakutensis Muadsub, Sawitree & Nantasak Pinkaew, 2014

== See also ==
- List of Tortricidae genera
