= Metaselena =

Scientific classification
- Domain: Eukaryota
- Kingdom: Animalia
- Phylum: Arthropoda
- Class: Insecta
- Order: Lepidoptera
- Family: Tortricidae
- Tribe: Enarmoniini
- Genus: Metaselena; Diakonoff, 1939

Genus of tortrix moths

Metaselena is a genus of moths belonging to the subfamily Olethreutinae of the family Tortricidae.

== Species ==
- Metaselena alboatra Diakonoff, 1939
- Metaselena allophlebodes Horak & Sauter, 1981
- Metaselena diakonoffi Horak & Sauter, 1981
- Metaselena lepta Horak & Sauter, 1981
- Metaselena pemphigodes Horak & Sauter, 1981
- Metaselena pithana Horak & Sauter, 1981
- Metaselena platyptera Horak & Sauter, 1981
- Metaselena rhabdota Horak & Sauter, 1981
- Metaselena symphylos Horak & Sauter, 1981

== See also ==
- List of Tortricidae genera
