= Pseudancylis =

Scientific classification
- Kingdom: Animalia
- Phylum: Arthropoda
- Class: Insecta
- Order: Lepidoptera
- Family: Tortricidae
- Tribe: Enarmoniini
- Genus: Pseudancylis; Horak, 2006

Genus of tortrix moths

Pseudancylis is a genus of moths of the family Tortricidae.

== Species ==
- Pseudancylis acrogypsa Turner, 2016
- Pseudancylis bisignum Razowski, 2016
- Pseudancylis elbahiana Razowski & Wojtusiak, 2013
- Pseudancylis kodaguensis Shashank, 2024
- Pseudancylis percnobathra (Meyrick, 1933)
- Pseudancylis rostrifera (Meyrick, 1912)
- Pseudancylis sphensaccula Razowski & Becker, 2015

== See also ==
- List of Tortricidae genera
