= Enarmoniini =

- Enarmonia formosana

Scientific classification
- Kingdom: Animalia
- Phylum: Arthropoda
- Class: Insecta
- Order: Lepidoptera
- Family: Tortricidae
- Subfamily: Olethreutinae
- Tribe: Enarmoniini; Diakonoff, 1953

Genera
- See text

Synonyms
- Ancylini Pierce & Metcalfe, 1922; Anchyloperidae Stainton, [1858]

Tribe of moths

The Enarmoniini are a tribe of tortrix moths.

== Genera ==
Aemulatrix
Aglaogonia
Anathamna
Ancylis
Ancylophyes
Anthozela
Argyroptocha
Balbidomaga
Cimeliomorpha
Crocostola
Cyphophanes
Dacgleia
Dasodis
Dasybregma
Embolostoma
Enarmonia
Enarmoniodes
Enarmonodes
Eucosmogastra
Eucosmomorpha
Fibuloides
Ganabalia
Genetancylis
Helictophanes
Heteroschistis
Hystrichophora
Irianassa
Loboschiza
Metaselena
Neoanathamna
Oriodryas
Paranthozela
Periphoeba
Protancylis
Pseudacroclita
Pseudancylis
Pseudophiaris
Pternidora
Semnostola
Sillybiphora
Sirindhornia
Taiwancylis
Tetramoera
Thymioptila
Thysanocrepis
Tokuana
Toonavora
Vicamentia
