= Balbidomaga =

Scientific classification
- Domain: Eukaryota
- Kingdom: Animalia
- Phylum: Arthropoda
- Class: Insecta
- Order: Lepidoptera
- Family: Tortricidae
- Tribe: Enarmoniini
- Genus: Balbidomaga; Diakonoff, 1983

Genus of tortrix moths

Balbidomaga is a genus of moths belonging to family Tortricidae.

== Species ==
- Balbidomaga dorophora Diakonoff, 1983
- Balbidomaga uptoini Horak, 2006

== See also ==
- List of Tortricidae genera
