= Beryllophantis allochlora =

Scientific classification
- Domain: Eukaryota
- Kingdom: Animalia
- Phylum: Arthropoda
- Class: Insecta
- Order: Lepidoptera
- Family: Tortricidae
- Genus: Beryllophantis
- Species: B. allochlora

Binomial name
- Beryllophantis allochlora Horak & Sauter, 1979

Species of moth

Beryllophantis allochlora is a species of moth of the family Tortricidae. It is found in Papua New Guinea. The habitat consists of montane rain forests with Nothofagus.

The wingspan is 12.5–14 mm for males and 14–14.5 mm for females.
