= Williella angulata =

Scientific classification
- Domain: Eukaryota
- Kingdom: Animalia
- Phylum: Arthropoda
- Class: Insecta
- Order: Lepidoptera
- Family: Tortricidae
- Genus: Williella
- Species: W. angulata

Binomial name
- Williella angulata Horak, 1984

Species of moth

Williella angulata is a species of moth of the family Tortricidae. It is found in New Caledonia in the southwest Pacific Ocean.
