= Beryllophantis =

Scientific classification
- Domain: Eukaryota
- Kingdom: Animalia
- Phylum: Arthropoda
- Class: Insecta
- Order: Lepidoptera
- Family: Tortricidae
- Tribe: Tortricini
- Genus: Beryllophantis; Meyrick, 1938

Genus of tortrix moths

Beryllophantis is a genus of moths belonging to the subfamily Tortricinae of the family Tortricidae.

== Species ==
- Beryllophantis allochlora Horak & Sauter, 1979
- Beryllophantis alphophora Horak & Sauter, 1979
- Beryllophantis asticta Horak & Sauter, 1979
- Beryllophantis cochlias Meyrick, 1938
- Beryllophantis microtera Horak & Sauter, 1979
- Beryllophantis phaioptera Horak & Sauter, 1979
- Beryllophantis poicila Horak & Sauter, 1979

== See also ==
- List of Tortricidae genera
