= Toonavora =

Scientific classification
- Kingdom: Animalia
- Phylum: Arthropoda
- Class: Insecta
- Order: Lepidoptera
- Family: Tortricidae
- Tribe: Enarmoniini
- Genus: Toonavora; Horak, 2006

Genus of tortrix moths

Toonavora is a genus of moths of the family Tortricidae.

== Species ==
- Toonavora aellaea (Turner, 1916)
- Toonavora spermatophaga (Diakonoff & Bradley, 1976)

== See also ==
- List of Tortricidae genera
