= Beryllophantis poicila =

Scientific classification
- Domain: Eukaryota
- Kingdom: Animalia
- Phylum: Arthropoda
- Class: Insecta
- Order: Lepidoptera
- Family: Tortricidae
- Genus: Beryllophantis
- Species: B. poicila

Binomial name
- Beryllophantis poicila Horak & Sauter, 1979

Species of moth

Beryllophantis poicila is a species of moth of the family Tortricidae. It is found in Papua New Guinea. The habitat consists of montane rain forests with Nothofagus.

The wingspan is about 13 mm.
