= Beryllophantis alphophora =

Scientific classification
- Domain: Eukaryota
- Kingdom: Animalia
- Phylum: Arthropoda
- Class: Insecta
- Order: Lepidoptera
- Family: Tortricidae
- Genus: Beryllophantis
- Species: B. alphophora

Binomial name
- Beryllophantis alphophora Horak & Sauter, 1979

Species of moth

Beryllophantis alphophora is a species of moth of the family Tortricidae. It is found in Papua New Guinea.

The wingspan is 12.5–13.5 mm for males and about 14 mm for females.
