= Costosa =

Scientific classification
- Kingdom: Animalia
- Phylum: Arthropoda
- Class: Insecta
- Order: Lepidoptera
- Family: Tortricidae
- Subfamily: Olethreutinae
- Genus: Costosa; Diakonoff, 1968

Genus of tortrix moths

Costosa is a genus of moths belonging to the subfamily Olethreutinae of the family Tortricidae.

== Species ==
- Costosa allochroma Diakonoff, 1968
- Costosa aphenia Diakonoff, 1973
- Costosa australis Horak, 2006
- Costosa rhodantha (Meyrick, 1907)

== See also ==
- List of Tortricidae genera
