= Williella =

Scientific classification
- Kingdom: Animalia
- Phylum: Arthropoda
- Clade: Pancrustacea
- Class: Insecta
- Order: Lepidoptera
- Family: Tortricidae
- Tribe: Archipini
- Genus: Williella; Horak, 1984

Genus of tortrix moths

Williella is a genus of moths belonging to the subfamily Tortricinae of the family Tortricidae.

== Details ==
The moth genus Williella, family Tortricidae, subfamily Tortricinae, was established in 1984 to accommodate two newly-described species from New Caledonia: Williella sauteri and Williella angulata.

Williella was tentatively assigned to the base of the Archipini. Phylogenetic analysis of their plesiomorphic morphology suggested that Williella species are members of a group of isolated and generalized moths from Australia, New Zealand and South America.

The discovery of the genus in New Caledonia suggested that these plesiomorphic modern Tortricinae are isolated descendants of a group of very generalized Tortricinae that were distributed throughout the Gondwana supercontinent before it broke up into many of the main modern landmasses of the Southern Hemisphere.

== Species ==
- Williella angulata Horak, 1984
- Williella picdupina Razowski, 2013
- Williella sauteri Horak, 1984

== See also ==
- List of Tortricidae genera
