= Beryllophantis phaioptera =

Scientific classification
- Domain: Eukaryota
- Kingdom: Animalia
- Phylum: Arthropoda
- Class: Insecta
- Order: Lepidoptera
- Family: Tortricidae
- Genus: Beryllophantis
- Species: B. phaioptera

Binomial name
- Beryllophantis phaioptera Horak & Sauter, 1979

Species of moth

Beryllophantis phaioptera is a species of moth of the family Tortricidae. It is found in Papua New Guinea.

The wingspan is about 12.5 mm. The ground colour of the forewings is glossy pale green with an emerald green tinge and mottled throughout with darker, duller green transverse streaks and areas with intermixed pale to dark ochrous and dark fuscous scales. The hindwings are evenly grey without any pattern.
