= Beryllophantis microtera =

Scientific classification
- Domain: Eukaryota
- Kingdom: Animalia
- Phylum: Arthropoda
- Class: Insecta
- Order: Lepidoptera
- Family: Tortricidae
- Genus: Beryllophantis
- Species: B. microtera

Binomial name
- Beryllophantis microtera Horak & Sauter, 1979

Species of moth

Beryllophantis microtera is a species of moth of the family Tortricidae. It is found in Papua New Guinea. The habitat consists of montane rain forests with Nothofagus.

The wingspan is 12.5 mm for males and 14.5 mm for females.
