= Enarmonodes =

Scientific classification
- Domain: Eukaryota
- Kingdom: Animalia
- Phylum: Arthropoda
- Class: Insecta
- Order: Lepidoptera
- Family: Tortricidae
- Tribe: Enarmoniini
- Genus: Enarmonodes; Danilevsky & Kuznetzov, 1968

Genus of tortrix moths

Enarmonodes is a genus of moths belonging to the subfamily Tortricinae of the family Tortricidae.

== Species ==
- Enarmonodes aeologlypta (Meyrick, 1936)
- Enarmonodes aino Kuznetzov, 1968
- Enarmonodes kunashirica Kuznetzov, 1969
- Enarmonodes recreantana (Kennel, 1900)

== See also ==
- List of Tortricidae genera
