= Williella picdupina =

Scientific classification
- Kingdom: Animalia
- Phylum: Arthropoda
- Class: Insecta
- Order: Lepidoptera
- Family: Tortricidae
- Genus: Williella
- Species: W. picdupina

Binomial name
- Williella picdupina Razowski, 2013

Species of moth

Williella picdupina is a species of moth of the family Tortricidae. It is found in New Caledonia in the southwest Pacific Ocean.

The wingspan is about 22 mm. The hindwings are greyish brown.
