= Enarmoniodes =

Scientific classification
- Kingdom: Animalia
- Phylum: Arthropoda
- Class: Insecta
- Order: Lepidoptera
- Family: Tortricidae
- Tribe: Enarmoniini
- Genus: Enarmoniodes; Ghesquire, 1940

Genus of tortrix moths

Enarmoniodes is a genus of moths belonging to the subfamily Olethreutinae of the family Tortricidae.

== Species ==
- Enarmoniodes furcula Kuznetzov, 1973
- Enarmoniodes mirabilis Ghesquire, 1940
- Enarmoniodes praetextana (Walsingham, 1897)

== See also ==
- List of Tortricidae genera
