= Aglaogonia =

Scientific classification
- Domain: Eukaryota
- Kingdom: Animalia
- Phylum: Arthropoda
- Class: Insecta
- Order: Lepidoptera
- Family: Tortricidae
- Tribe: Enarmoniini
- Genus: Aglaogonia; Horak, 2006

Genus of tortrix moths

Aglaogonia is a genus of moths of the family Tortricidae.

== Species ==
- Aglaogonia eupena (Turner, 1946)
- Aglaogonia historica (Meyrick, 1920)

== See also ==
- List of Tortricidae genera
