= Tetramoera schistaceana =

Scientific classification
- Kingdom: Animalia
- Phylum: Arthropoda
- Class: Insecta
- Order: Lepidoptera
- Family: Tortricidae
- Genus: Tetramoera
- Species: T. schistaceana

Binomial name
- Tetramoera schistaceana (Snellen, 1891)

Synonyms
- Grapholitha schistaceana Snellen, 1891

Species of moth

Tetramoera schistaceana, the grey borer of sugar cane, is a moth of the family Tortricidae. It is found in Indonesia (Java), China (Guangdong), Taiwan, Malaysia, the Philippines, Mauritius, Hawaii, Madagascar and Réunion.

The wingspan is 14–18 mm.

The larvae feed on Saccharum dulce.
