= Hystrichophora loricana =

Conservation status
- Vulnerable (NatureServe)

Scientific classification
- Kingdom: Animalia
- Phylum: Arthropoda
- Class: Insecta
- Order: Lepidoptera
- Family: Tortricidae
- Genus: Hystrichophora
- Species: H. loricana

Binomial name
- Hystrichophora loricana (Grote, 1880)

Species of moth

Hystrichophora loricana is a rare moth in the genus Hystrichophora, found in the United States.

Its caterpillars are known to use Orbexilum onobrychis as their exclusive foodplant.
