= Crocostola =

Scientific classification
- Domain: Eukaryota
- Kingdom: Animalia
- Phylum: Arthropoda
- Class: Insecta
- Order: Lepidoptera
- Family: Tortricidae
- Tribe: Enarmoniini
- Genus: Crocostola; Diakonoff, 1953

Genus of tortrix moths

Crocostola is a genus of moths belonging to the subfamily Olethreutinae of the family Tortricidae.

== Species ==
- Crocostola hyperphyes Diakonoff, 1953

== See also ==
- List of Tortricidae genera
