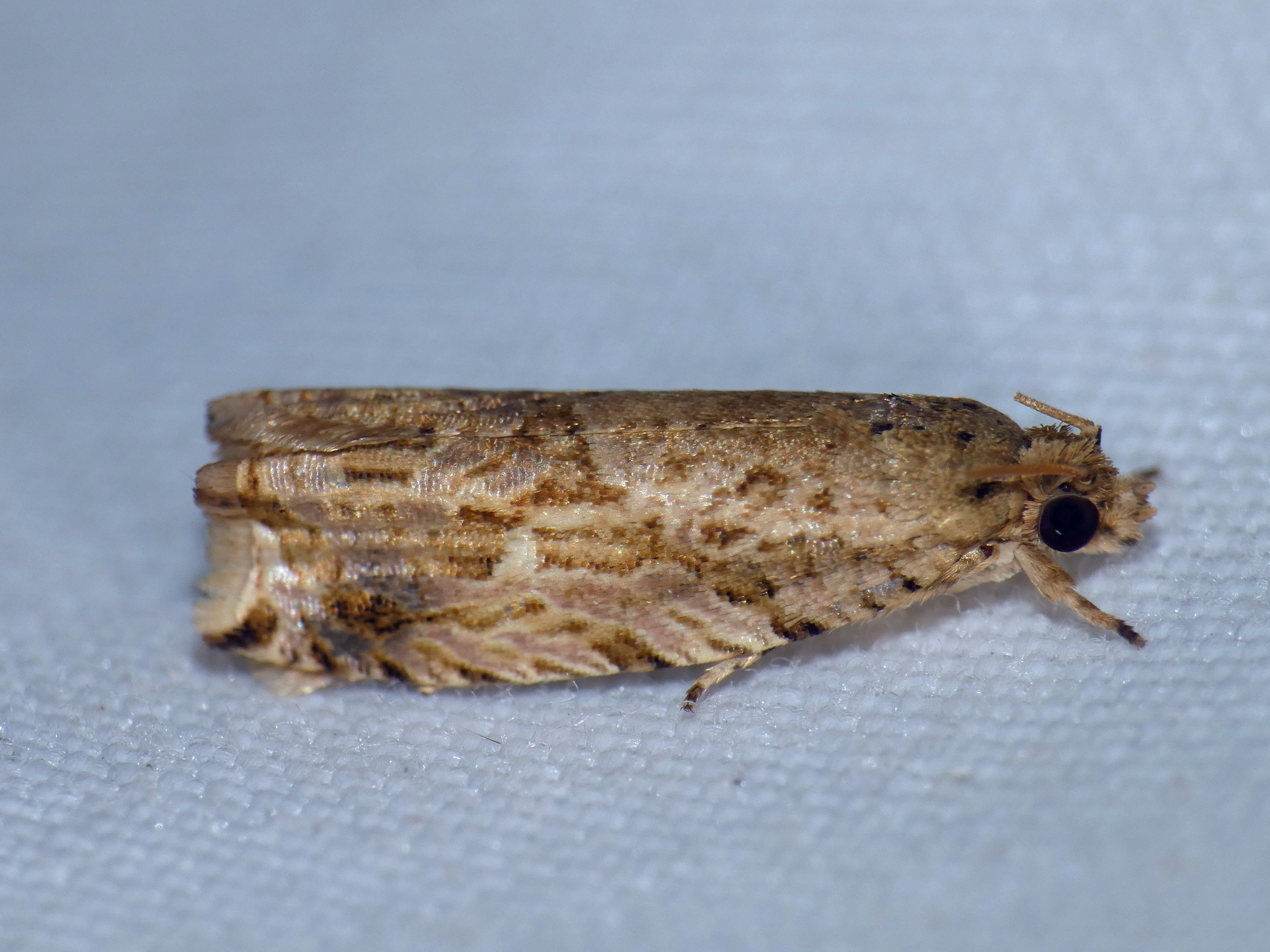
- Tetramoera gracilistria

Scientific classification
- Kingdom: Animalia
- Phylum: Arthropoda
- Clade: Pancrustacea
- Class: Insecta
- Order: Lepidoptera
- Family: Tortricidae
- Tribe: Enarmoniini
- Genus: Tetramoera; Diakonoff, 1968

= Tetramoera =

Genus of tortrix moths

Tetramoera is a genus of moths belonging to the subfamily Olethreutinae of the family Tortricidae.

== Species ==
- Tetramoera calligrapha (Meyrick, 1912)
- Tetramoera flavescens Kuznetsov, 1988
- Tetramoera gracilistria (Turner, 1946)
- Tetramoera isogramma (Meyrick, 1908)
- Tetramoera leptalea Diakonoff, 1988
- Tetramoera paragramma (Meyrick, 1909)
- Tetramoera schistaceana (Snellen, 1891)

== See also ==
- List of Tortricidae genera
