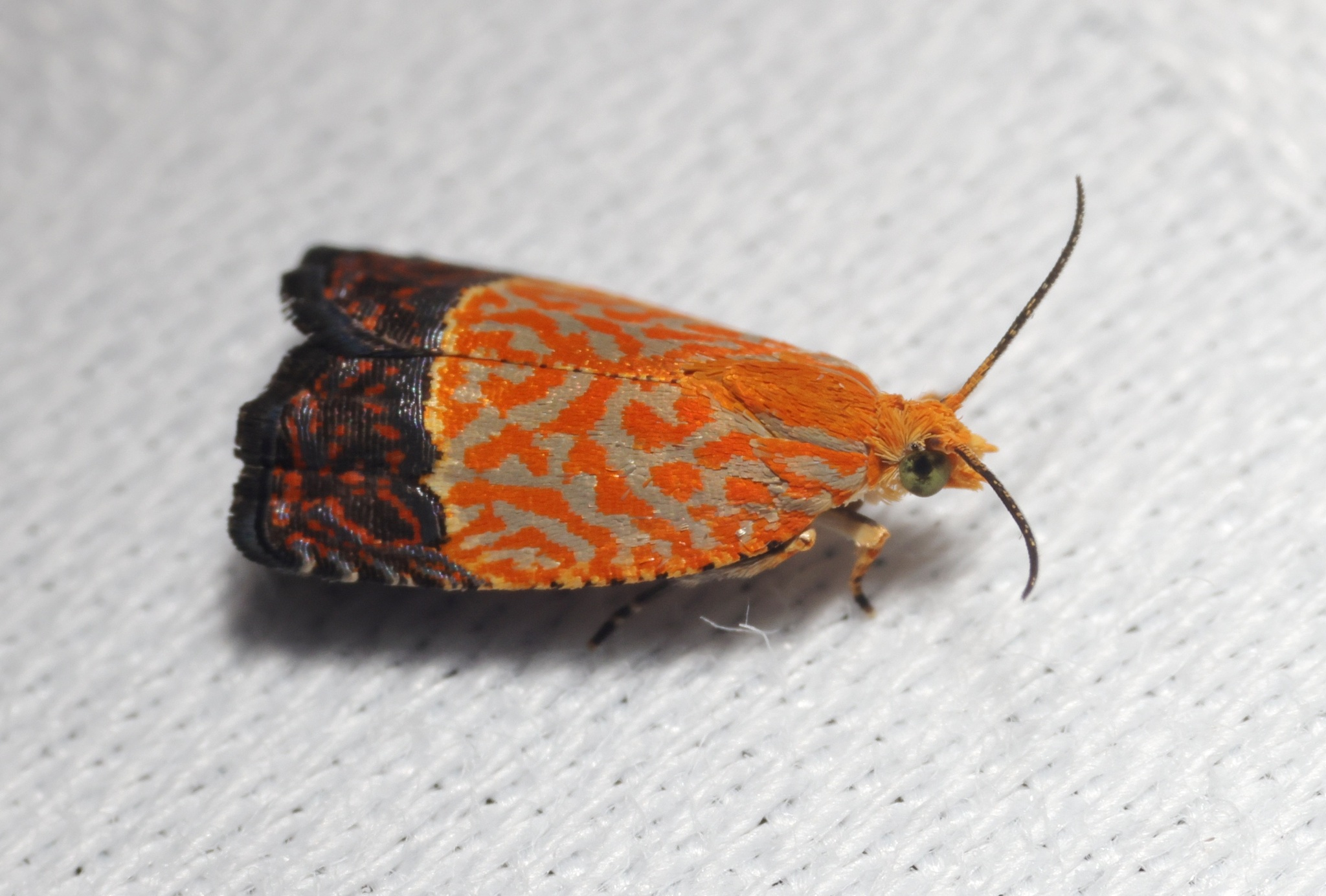

Scientific classification
- Kingdom: Animalia
- Phylum: Arthropoda
- Class: Insecta
- Order: Lepidoptera
- Family: Tortricidae
- Genus: Loboschiza
- Species: L. koenigiana

Binomial name
- Loboschiza koenigiana (Fabricius, 1775)

Synonyms
- Pyralis koenigiana Fabricius, 1775; Rhadinoscolops koenigana; Hemerosia aurantiana Pryer, 1877; Grapholitha delectana Snellen, 1902; Pyralis koenigana Fabricius, 1787; Eucelis vulnerata Walsingham, in Swinhoe, 1900

= Loboschiza koenigiana =

Species of moth

Loboschiza koenigiana, the orange tortricid moth or leaf webber, is a moth of the family Tortricidae. The species was first described by Johan Christian Fabricius in 1775. It is found in the United Arab Emirates, Pakistan, India, Sri Lanka, Myanmar, China, Malaysia, Thailand, Java in Indonesia, New Guinea, Queensland in Australia, the Philippines, Taiwan, Japan and Korea.

The wingspan is about 12 mm. The larvae feed on Azadirachta indica, Melia azedarach, Owenia venosa, Aglaia sapindina, Jasminum sambac and Hibiscus rosa-sinensis.
