= Thysanocrepis =

Scientific classification
- Domain: Eukaryota
- Kingdom: Animalia
- Phylum: Arthropoda
- Class: Insecta
- Order: Lepidoptera
- Family: Tortricidae
- Tribe: Enarmoniini
- Genus: Thysanocrepis; Diakonoff, 1966

Genus of tortrix moths

Thysanocrepis is a genus of moths belonging to the subfamily Olethreutinae of the family Tortricidae.

== Species ==
- Thysanocrepis celebensis Diakonoff, 1975
- Thysanocrepis crossota (Meyrick, 1911)

== See also ==
- List of Tortricidae genera
