= Beryllophantis cochlias =

Scientific classification
- Domain: Eukaryota
- Kingdom: Animalia
- Phylum: Arthropoda
- Class: Insecta
- Order: Lepidoptera
- Family: Tortricidae
- Genus: Beryllophantis
- Species: B. cochlias

Binomial name
- Beryllophantis cochlias Meyrick, 1938

Species of moth

Beryllophantis cochlias is a species of moth of the family Tortricidae. It is found in Papua New Guinea and West Irian. The habitat consists of montane rain-forests.

The wingspan is 13–16 mm for males and 14–17 mm for females.
