= Anthozela anonidii =

Scientific classification
- Kingdom: Animalia
- Phylum: Arthropoda
- Class: Insecta
- Order: Lepidoptera
- Family: Tortricidae
- Genus: Anthozela
- Species: A. anonidii

Binomial name
- Anthozela anonidii Ghesquière, 1940

Species of moth

Anthozela anonidii is a species of moth of the family Tortricidae. It is found in the Democratic Republic of Congo.
