= Aemulatrix =

Scientific classification
- Domain: Eukaryota
- Kingdom: Animalia
- Phylum: Arthropoda
- Class: Insecta
- Order: Lepidoptera
- Family: Tortricidae
- Tribe: Enarmoniini
- Genus: Aemulatrix; Diakonoff, 1982

Genus of tortrix moths

Aemulatrix is a genus of moths belonging to the subfamily Olethreutinae of the family Tortricidae.

== Species ==
- Aemulatrix aequilibra Diakonoff, 1982 (from Sri Lanka)
- Aemulatrix notognatha Diakonoff, 1988 (from Madagascar)

== See also ==
- List of Tortricidae genera
