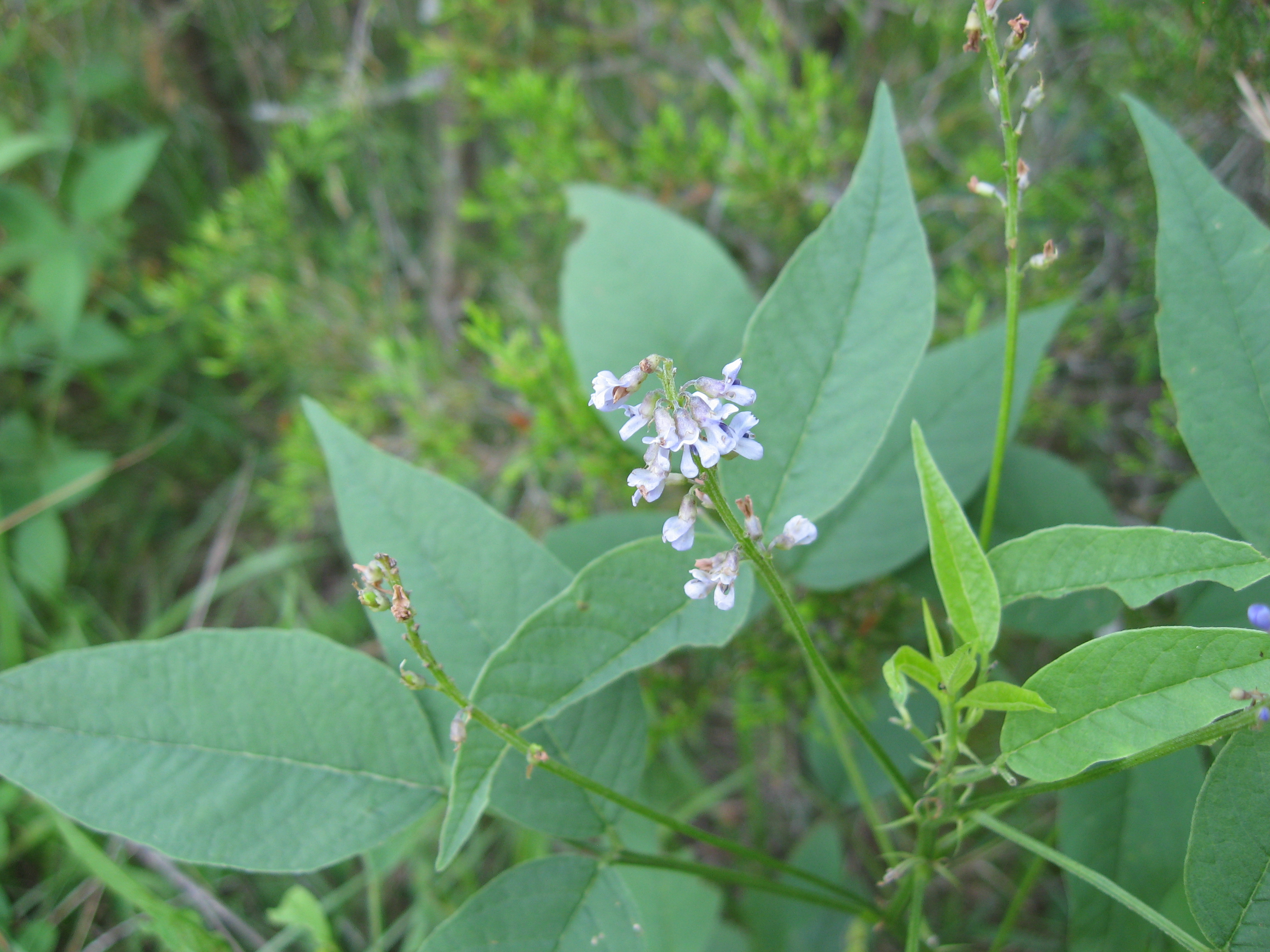

Conservation status
- Secure (NatureServe)

Scientific classification
- Kingdom: Plantae
- Clade: Tracheophytes
- Clade: Angiosperms
- Clade: Eudicots
- Clade: Rosids
- Order: Fabales
- Family: Fabaceae
- Subfamily: Faboideae
- Genus: Orbexilum
- Species: O. onobrychis

Binomial name
- Orbexilum onobrychis (Nutt.) Rydb.

Synonyms
- Psoralea onobrychis

= Orbexilum onobrychis =

Species of legume

Orbexilum onobrychis, commonly called French-grass or lanceleaf scurfpea, is a species of flowering plant in the legume family (Fabaceae). It is native to the eastern United States where its range is concentrated in the Midwest and Upper South. Its natural habitat is primarily prairies and riverbanks, typically in mesic or wet areas. It is an uncommon species, and can be found in high-quality prairie remnants as well as more disturbed areas.

It is a rhizomatous perennial that forms large colonies. It has pinnately trifoliate leaves, with large lanceolate leaflets. Its flowers are pale blue or purple, and produced in racemes. Bloom time is from late spring to early summer. Its fruits are beans, which are 6–8 mm long and distinctively warty.

The caterpillars of the rare moth Hystrichophora loricana are known to use Orbexilum onobrychis as their exclusive foodplant.
