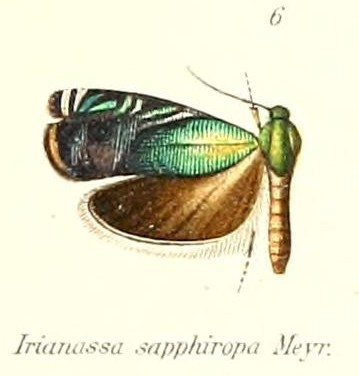

Scientific classification
- Kingdom: Animalia
- Phylum: Arthropoda
- Class: Insecta
- Order: Lepidoptera
- Family: Tortricidae
- Genus: Irianassa
- Species: I. sapphiropa

Binomial name
- Irianassa sapphiropa Meyrick, 1905

= Irianassa sapphiropa =

Species of moth

Irianassa sapphiropa is a moth of the family Tortricidae first described by Edward Meyrick in 1905. It is found in Sri Lanka.
