= Heterochorista =

Scientific classification
- Domain: Eukaryota
- Kingdom: Animalia
- Phylum: Arthropoda
- Class: Insecta
- Order: Lepidoptera
- Family: Tortricidae
- Subfamily: Tortricinae
- Tribe: Archipini
- Genus: Heterochorista; Diakonoff, 1952

Synonyms
- Nikolaia Diakonoff, 1953

Genus of tortrix moths

Heterochorista is a genus of moths belonging to the subfamily Tortricinae of the family Tortricidae. The genus was erected by Alexey Diakonoff in 1952.

== Species ==
- Heterochorista acomata Horak, 1984
- Heterochorista aperta (Diakonoff, 1953)
- Heterochorista aura Horak, 1984
- Heterochorista chrysonetha (Diakonoff, 1953)
- Heterochorista classeyiana Horak, 1984
- Heterochorista dispersa Diakonoff, 1952
- Heterochorista fulgens Horak, 1984
- Heterochorista inumbrata (Diakonoff, 1953)
- Heterochorista melanopsygma (Diakonoff, 1953)
- Heterochorista nitida Horak, 1984
- Heterochorista ornata Horak, 1984
- Heterochorista papuana (Diakonoff, 1952)
- Heterochorista polysperma (Diakonoff, 1952)
- Heterochorista prisca Horak, 1984
- Heterochorista punctulana Horak, 1984
- Heterochorista rostrata Horak, 1984
- Heterochorista rufulimaculata Horak, 1984
- Heterochorista signata Horak, 1984
- Heterochorista spinosa Horak, 1984
- Heterochorista trivialis Horak, 1984

== See also ==
- List of Tortricidae genera
