= Anathamna =

Scientific classification
- Domain: Eukaryota
- Kingdom: Animalia
- Phylum: Arthropoda
- Class: Insecta
- Order: Lepidoptera
- Family: Tortricidae
- Tribe: Enarmoniini
- Genus: Anathamna; Meyrick, 1911

Genus of tortrix moths

Anathamna is a genus of moths belonging to the subfamily Olethreutinae of the family Tortricidae.

== Species ==
- Anathamna anthostoma Meyrick, 1928
- Anathamna chionopyra Diakonoff, 1953
- Anathamna megalozona Meyrick, 1916
- Anathamna neospermatophaga Pooni & Rose, 2005
- Anathamna ostracitis Meyrick, 1911
- Anathamna plana Meyrick, 1911
- Anathamna syringias Meyrick, 1911

== See also ==
- List of Tortricidae genera
