= Helictophanes =

Scientific classification
- Domain: Eukaryota
- Kingdom: Animalia
- Phylum: Arthropoda
- Class: Insecta
- Order: Lepidoptera
- Family: Tortricidae
- Tribe: Enarmoniini
- Genus: Helictophanes; Meyrick, 1881

Genus of tortrix moths

Helictophanes is a genus of moths belonging to the subfamily Olethreutinae of the family Tortricidae.

== Species ==
- Helictophanes argillacea (Clarke, 1976)
- Helictophanes myriolychna (Turner, 1946)
- Helictophanes prospera (Meyrick, 1909)
- Helictophanes scambodes (Meyrick, 1911)
- Helictophanes uberana Meyrick, 1881

== See also ==
- List of Tortricidae genera
