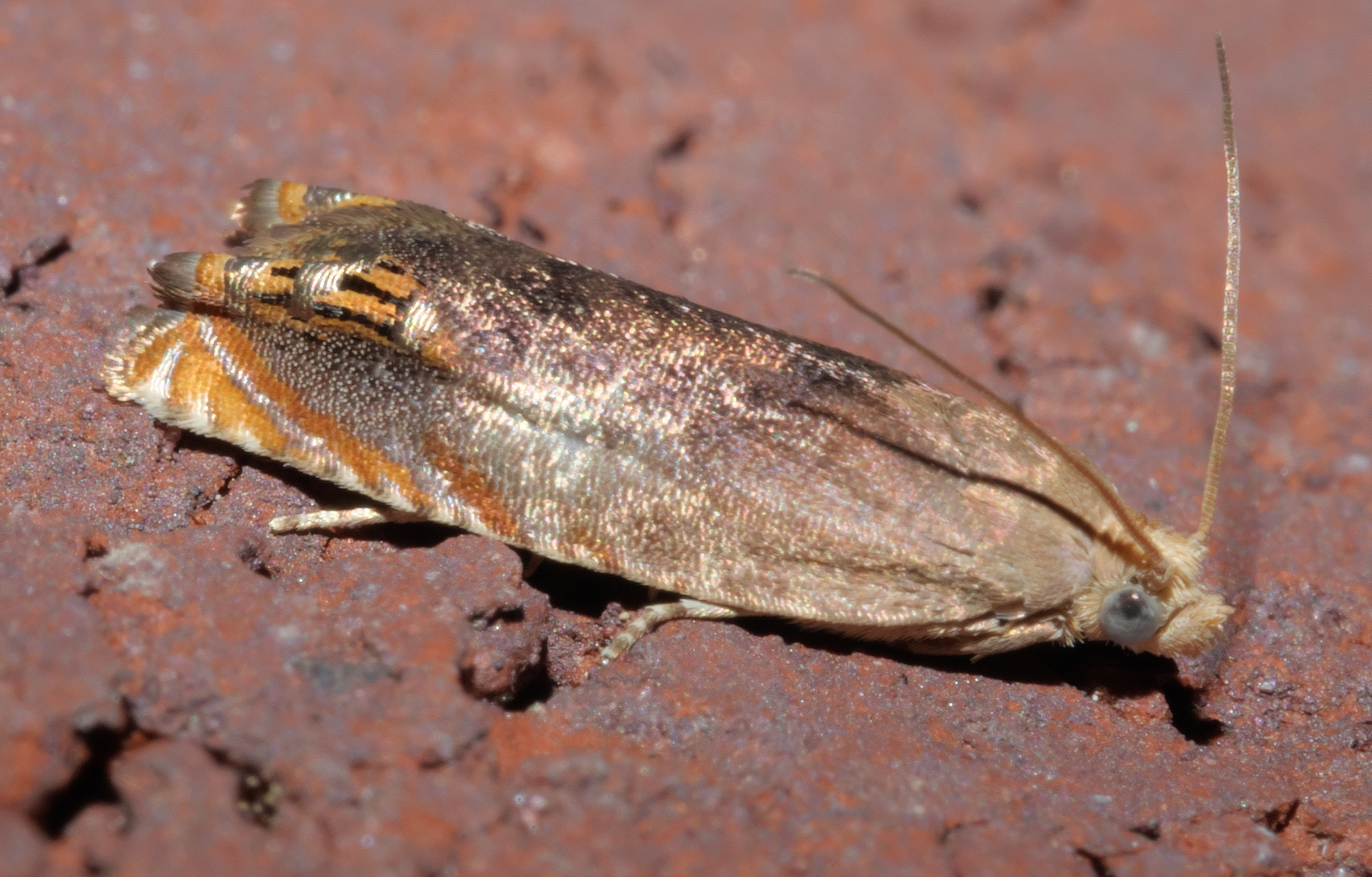

Scientific classification
- Kingdom: Animalia
- Phylum: Arthropoda
- Class: Insecta
- Order: Lepidoptera
- Family: Tortricidae
- Genus: Hystrichophora
- Species: H. taleana

Binomial name
- Hystrichophora taleana (Grote, 1878)

Synonyms
- Grapholitha taleana Grote, 1878; Hystricophora taleana

= Hystrichophora taleana =

Species of moth

Hystrichophora taleana, commonly known as the indigobush twig borer, is a species of moth in the family Tortricidae. It is known from the United States, where it has been found in Washington and Sharkey counties in Mississippi and Chico County in south-eastern Arkansas.

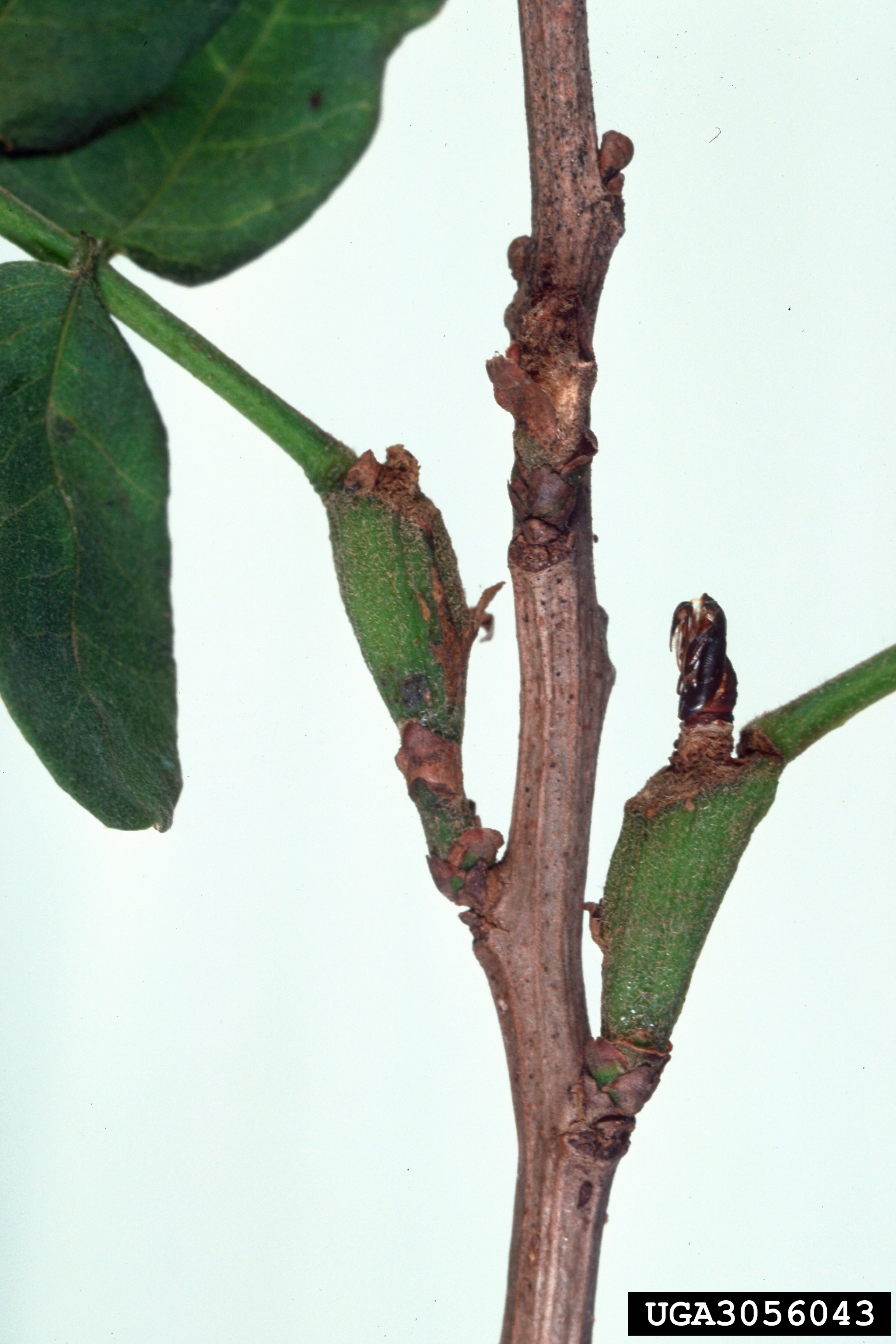
Damage

.
