= Eucosmomorpha multicolor =

Scientific classification
- Kingdom: Animalia
- Phylum: Arthropoda
- Class: Insecta
- Order: Lepidoptera
- Family: Tortricidae
- Genus: Eucosmomorpha
- Species: E. multicolor

Binomial name
- Eucosmomorpha multicolor Kuznetzov, 1964

Synonyms
- Eucosmomorpha multicola Park & Ahn, 1987

Species of moth

Eucosmomorpha multicolor is a moth of the family Tortricidae. It is found in the Russian Far East (including Primorsky Krai, Amur, Maritime Territory), the Korean Peninsula and Japan.

Its habitat consists of lowland broad-leaved forests.

The wingspan is 12–14 mm (0.47–0.55 in).
