= Dasodis =

Scientific classification
- Domain: Eukaryota
- Kingdom: Animalia
- Phylum: Arthropoda
- Class: Insecta
- Order: Lepidoptera
- Family: Tortricidae
- Tribe: Enarmoniini
- Genus: Dasodis; Diakonoff, 1982

Genus of tortrix moths

Dasodis is a genus of moths belonging to the family Tortricidae.

== Species ==
- Dasodis cladographa Diakonoff, 1983
- Dasodis microphthora (Meyrick, 1936)

== See also ==
- List of Tortricidae genera
