= Heterochorista dispersa =

Scientific classification
- Domain: Eukaryota
- Kingdom: Animalia
- Phylum: Arthropoda
- Class: Insecta
- Order: Lepidoptera
- Family: Tortricidae
- Genus: Heterochorista
- Species: H. dispersa

Binomial name
- Heterochorista dispersa Diakonoff, 1952

Species of moth

Heterochorista dispersa is a species of moth of the family Tortricidae. It is found in New Guinea.
