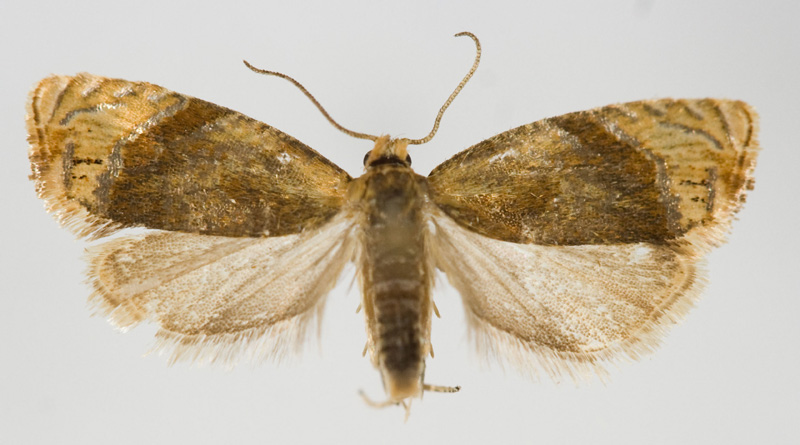
- Eucosmomorpha albersana

Scientific classification
- Kingdom: Animalia
- Phylum: Arthropoda
- Class: Insecta
- Order: Lepidoptera
- Family: Tortricidae
- Tribe: Enarmoniini
- Genus: Eucosmomorpha; Obraztsov, 1951

= Eucosmomorpha =

Genus of tortrix moths

Eucosmomorpha is a genus of moths belonging to the subfamily Olethreutinae of the family Tortricidae.

== Species ==
- Eucosmomorpha albersana (Hubner, [1811-1813])
- Eucosmomorpha figurana (Kuznetzov, 1997)
- Eucosmomorpha multicolor Kuznetzov, 1964
- Eucosmomorpha nearctica Miller, 2002

== See also ==
- List of Tortricidae genera
