= Tetramoera isogramma =

Scientific classification
- Kingdom: Animalia
- Phylum: Arthropoda
- Class: Insecta
- Order: Lepidoptera
- Family: Tortricidae
- Genus: Tetramoera
- Species: T. isogramma

Binomial name
- Tetramoera isogramma (Meyrick, 1908)

Synonyms
- Cydia isogramma Meyrick, 1908; Tetramoera isogramma (Meyrick, 1908); Eucosma isogramma Clarke, 1958

Species of moth

Tetramoera isogramma is a moth of the family Tortricidae first described by Edward Meyrick in 1908. It is found in Sri Lanka, Malaysia, Hong Kong, Réunion and Africa.

The species' larval host plant is Saccharum officinarum.
