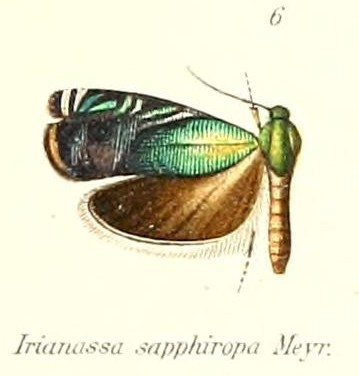
- Irianassa sapphiropa

Scientific classification
- Domain: Eukaryota
- Kingdom: Animalia
- Phylum: Arthropoda
- Class: Insecta
- Order: Lepidoptera
- Family: Tortricidae
- Tribe: Enarmoniini
- Genus: Irianassa; Meyrick, 1905

= Irianassa =

Genus of tortrix moths

Irianassa is a genus of moths belonging to the family Tortricidae.

== Species ==
- Irianassa aetheria (Turner, 1946)
- Irianassa poecilaspis Meyrick, 1923
- Irianassa sapphiropa Meyrick, 1905 (from Sri Lanka)
- Irianassa speciosana (Pagenstecher, 1900)
- Irianassa uranopa Meyrick, 1927

== See also ==
- List of Tortricidae genera
