= Taiwancylis =

Scientific classification
- Kingdom: Animalia
- Phylum: Arthropoda
- Clade: Pancrustacea
- Class: Insecta
- Order: Lepidoptera
- Family: Tortricidae
- Tribe: Enarmoniini
- Genus: Taiwancylis; Razowski, 2000
- Species: T. cladodium

Binomial name
- Taiwancylis cladodium Razowski, 2000

Monotypic genus of tortrix moths

Taiwancylis is a genus of moths belonging to the family Tortricidae. It contains only one species, Taiwancylis cladodium, which is found in Taiwan.

The moth species is reported from Kerala outside Taiwan by Poon et al.

The wingspan of the holotype, a male, is 11.5 mm. It was caught in mid-May in Shanping, Kaohsiung, at 640 m (2,100 ft) above sea level.

== See also ==
- List of Tortricidae genera
