= Enarmonia formosana =

Cherry-bark moth
- Adults (image from entomart.be)

Scientific classification
- Kingdom: Animalia
- Phylum: Arthropoda
- Clade: Pancrustacea
- Class: Insecta
- Order: Lepidoptera
- Family: Tortricidae
- Genus: Enarmonia
- Species: E. formosana

Binomial name
- Enarmonia formosana (Scopoli, 1763)

Synonyms
- List: Laspeyresia woeberiana (Denis & Schiffermüller, 1775); Phalaena formosana Scopoli, 1763; Pyralis woeberana Fabricius, 1787; Tortrix ornatana Hübner, [1796–99]; Tortrix scriptana Thunberg & Borgström, 1784; Tortrix woeberiana Denis & Schiffermüller, 1775

Species of moth

Enarmonia formosana, the cherry-bark moth or cherry bark tortrix, is a small but colourful moth species in the family Tortricidae, native to Asia, Europe, and northern Africa, and introduced in North America. It was first described by the Italian physician and naturalist Giovanni Antonio Scopoli in 1763 and is the type species of its genus (Enarmonia), and by extension of the tribe Enarmoniini of subfamily Olethreutinae.

== Description ==
The wingspan is 15–19 mm. The forewings have a moderately arched costa. The ground colour is ferruginous-ochreous, with leaden metallic striae. The costa is blackish, posteriorly strigulated with white. The basal patch has the edge sharply angulated in the middle and indented near the dorsum. The central fascia is interrupted in the middle dark fuscous, marked with ferruginous-ochreous. The ocellus is black, edged with leaden-metallic and streaked with ferruginous, surmounted by a dark fuscous curved mark. The hindwings are rather dark fuscous. The larva is creamy white with an orange-brown head.

The moths fly from May to October in the temperate parts of the range (e.g. Belgium and the Netherlands).

The caterpillars feed on the bark of woody Rosaceae of subfamily Amygdaloideae, including hawthorns (Crataegus), apples (Malus), cherries and plums (Prunus), pears (Pyrus), and rowans (Sorbus). In particular, they have been noted to forage at canker lesions. They prefer mature trees and produce a reddish frass at the entrance to their tunnel. Signs of larval feeding can be seen at cracks in the bark, or at joints with branches. The larva pupates at the entrance to its tunnel, often enclosed by frass secured with silk.

== Distribution ==
It is native to most of Europe, extending eastwards through Asia to Siberia and Kazakhstan and south to Maghreb in North Africa. Possibly and most likely introduced populations are found in Asia Minor and North America.
