= Eucosmogastra =

Scientific classification
- Kingdom: Animalia
- Phylum: Arthropoda
- Class: Insecta
- Order: Lepidoptera
- Family: Tortricidae
- Tribe: Enarmoniini
- Genus: Eucosmogastra; Diakonoff, 1975

Genus of tortrix moths

Eucosmogastra is a genus of moths belonging to the subfamily Olethreutinae of the family Tortricidae.

== Species ==
- Eucosmogastra aeolantha (Meyrick, 1914)
- Eucosmogastra aeraria (Meyrick, 1909)
- Eucosmogastra anthochroa Diakonoff, 1975
- Eucosmogastra callicratis (Meyrick, 1909)
- Eucosmogastra kontumica Razowski, 2009
- Eucosmogastra miltographa (Meyrick, 1907)
- Eucosmogastra poetica (Meyrick, 1909)
- Eucosmogastra pyrrhopa (Lower, 1896)

== See also ==
- List of Tortricidae genera
