= Anthozela daressalami =

Scientific classification
- Kingdom: Animalia
- Phylum: Arthropoda
- Class: Insecta
- Order: Lepidoptera
- Family: Tortricidae
- Genus: Anthozela
- Species: A. daressalami

Binomial name
- Anthozela daressalami Razowski, 2013

Species of moth

Anthozela daressalami is a species of moth of the family Tortricidae. It is found in Tanzania.

The wingspan is about 15 mm.

== Etymology ==
The species name refers to Dar es Salaam, the type locality.
