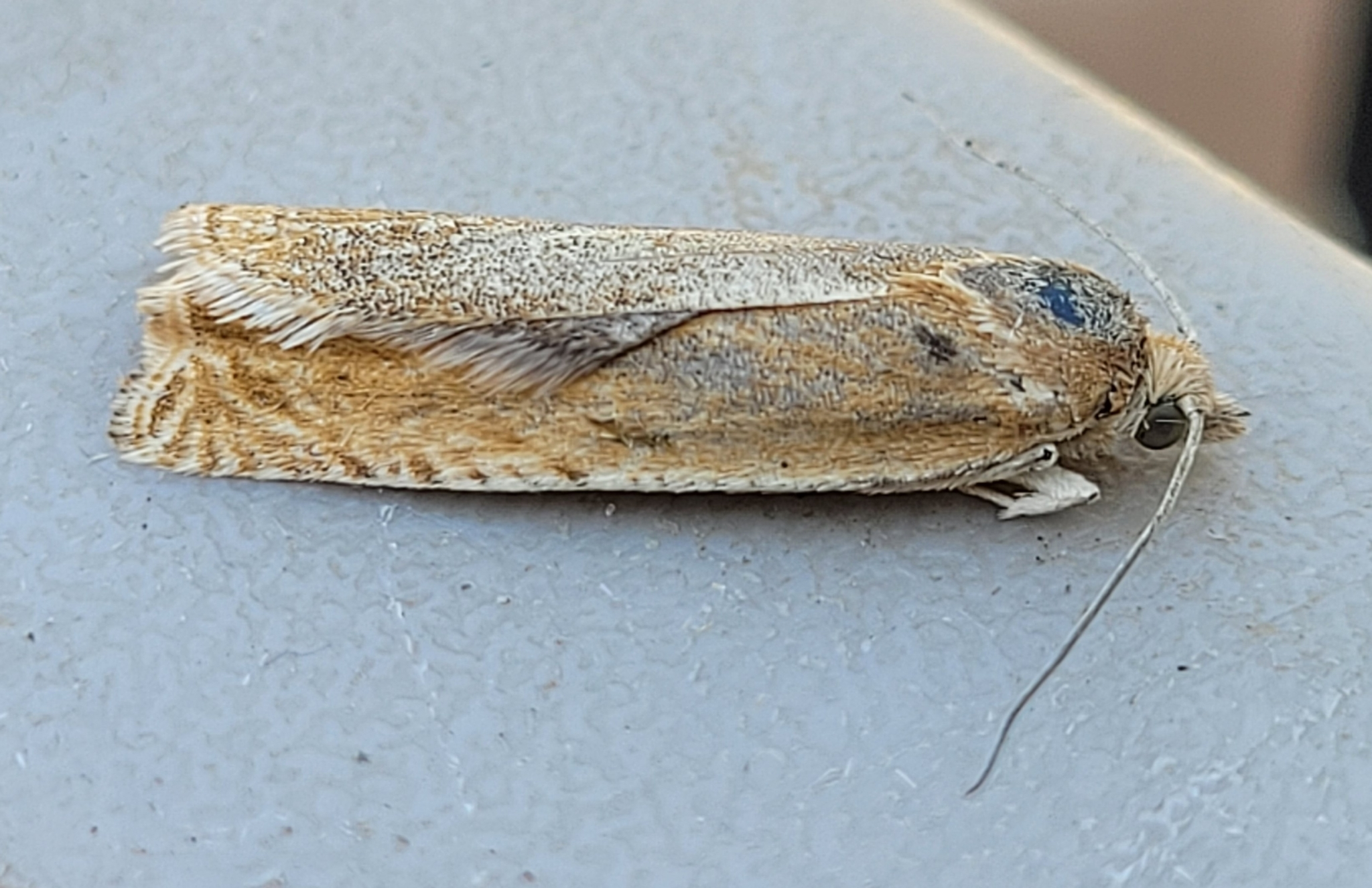

Scientific classification
- Kingdom: Animalia
- Phylum: Arthropoda
- Class: Insecta
- Order: Lepidoptera
- Family: Tortricidae
- Subfamily: Olethreutinae
- Tribe: Enarmoniini
- Genus: Hystrichophora; Walsingham, 1879

= Hystrichophora (moth) =

Genus of tortrix moths

Hystrichophora is a genus of moths belonging to the family Tortricidae.

== Species ==
- Hystrichophora asphodelana (Kearfott, 1907)
- Hystrichophora decorosa Heinrich, 1929
- Hystrichophora leonana Walsingham, 1879
- Hystrichophora loricana (Grote, 1880)
- Hystrichophora ochreicostana (Walsingham, 1884)
- Hystrichophora ostentatrix Heinrich, 1923
- Hystrichophora paradisiae Heinrich, 1923
- Hystrichophora roessleri (Zeller, 1875)
- Hystrichophora stygiana (Dyar, 1903)
- Hystrichophora taleana (Grote, 1878)
- Hystrichophora vestaliana (Zeller, 1875)

== See also ==
- List of Tortricidae genera
