= Coleophora horakae =

Scientific classification
- Kingdom: Animalia
- Phylum: Arthropoda
- Clade: Pancrustacea
- Class: Insecta
- Order: Lepidoptera
- Family: Coleophoridae
- Genus: Coleophora
- Species: C. horakae

Binomial name
- Coleophora horakae Baldizzone, 1996

Synonyms
- Coleopbora borakae

Species of moth

Coleophora horakae is a moth of the family Coleophoridae. It is found in Australia from southern Queensland and the tablelands of New South Wales to the central part of the country.

The wingspan is about 10 mm (0.39 in).

== Etymology ==
The species is dedicated to Dr. Marianne Horak.
