= Tokuana =

Scientific classification
- Kingdom: Animalia
- Phylum: Arthropoda
- Class: Insecta
- Order: Lepidoptera
- Family: Tortricidae
- Tribe: Enarmoniini
- Genus: Tokuana; Kawabe, 1978

Genus of tortrix moths

Tokuana is a genus of moths belonging to the subfamily Olethreutinae of the family Tortricidae.

== Species ==
- Tokuana imbrica Kawabe, 1978

== See also ==
- List of Tortricidae genera
