= Vicamentia =

Scientific classification
- Kingdom: Animalia
- Phylum: Arthropoda
- Class: Insecta
- Order: Lepidoptera
- Family: Tortricidae
- Tribe: Enarmoniini
- Genus: Vicamentia; Razowski, 2009
- Species: V. vietnamica

Binomial name
- Vicamentia vietnamica Razowski, 2009

Genus of moths

Vicamentia is a genus of moths belonging to the subfamily Olethreutinae of the family Tortricidae. It contains only one species, Vicamentia vietnamica, which is found in Vietnam.

The wingspan is 12 mm.

== See also ==
- List of Tortricidae genera
