= Toonavora aellaea =

Scientific classification
- Kingdom: Animalia
- Phylum: Arthropoda
- Class: Insecta
- Order: Lepidoptera
- Family: Tortricidae
- Genus: Toonavora
- Species: T. aellaea

Binomial name
- Toonavora aellaea (Turner, 1916)

Synonyms
- Eucosma aellaea Turner, 1916

Species of moth

Toonavora aellaea is a species of moth of the family Tortricidae. It is found in Australia, where it has been recorded from Queensland and New South Wales.

The wingspan is about 12 mm. The forewings are pale ochreous brown, with dark fuscous-brown transverse lines. There are alternate fuscous-brown and whitish strigulae (fine streaks) on the costa. The hindwings are brownish fuscous, but paler towards the base.
