= Thysanocrepis crossota =

Scientific classification
- Kingdom: Animalia
- Phylum: Arthropoda
- Class: Insecta
- Order: Lepidoptera
- Family: Tortricidae
- Genus: Thysanocrepis
- Species: T. crossota

Binomial name
- Thysanocrepis crossota (Meyrick, 1911)

Synonyms
- Argyroploce crossota Meyrick, 1911

Species of moth

Thysanocrepis crossota is a moth of the family Tortricidae. It is found in Thailand, the Solomon Islands, New Guinea and Vietnam. Records for Australia represent a misidentification.
