= Semnostola =

Scientific classification
- Domain: Eukaryota
- Kingdom: Animalia
- Phylum: Arthropoda
- Class: Insecta
- Order: Lepidoptera
- Family: Tortricidae
- Tribe: Enarmoniini
- Genus: Semnostola; Diakonoff, 1959

Genus of tortrix moths

Semnostola is a genus of moths belonging to the subfamily Olethreutinae of the family Tortricidae. It was described by Alexey Diakonoff in 1959.

== Species ==
- Semnostola arquatana Kuznetzov, 1988
- Semnostola atrana Kuznetzov, 1988
- Semnostola grandaedeaga Xu & Wang, 2006
- Semnostola magnifica (Kuznetzov, 1964)
- Semnostola mystica Diakonoff, 1959
- Semnostola thrasyplaca (T. B. Fletcher, 1940)
- Semnostola triangulata Nasu & Kogi, 1997
- Semnostola trisignifera Kuznetzov, 1970

== See also ==
- List of Tortricidae genera
