= Cimeliomorpha =

Scientific classification
- Domain: Eukaryota
- Kingdom: Animalia
- Phylum: Arthropoda
- Class: Insecta
- Order: Lepidoptera
- Family: Tortricidae
- Tribe: Enarmoniini
- Genus: Cimeliomorpha; Diakonoff, 1966

Genus of tortrix moths

Cimeliomorpha is a genus of moths belonging to the subfamily Olethreutinae of the family Tortricidae.

== Species ==
- Cimeliomorpha cymbalora (Meyrick, 1907)
- Cimeliomorpha egregiana (Felder & Rogenhofer, 1875)
- Cimeliomorpha nabokovi Kuznetzov, 1997
- Cimeliomorpha novarana (Felder & Rogenhofer, 1875)

== See also ==
- List of Tortricidae genera
