= Paranthozela =

Scientific classification
- Kingdom: Animalia
- Phylum: Arthropoda
- Class: Insecta
- Order: Lepidoptera
- Family: Tortricidae
- Subfamily: Olethreutinae
- Tribe: Enarmoniini
- Genus: Paranthozela; Razowski & Wojtusiak, 2007

Genus of tortrix moths

Paranthozela is a genus of moths originally placed in the tribe Enarmoniini of the subfamily Olethreutinae. However, some regard it as an unplaced genus within the family Tortricidae.

The genus is contained within Ecuador. The moths live in forest habitats from 1,000–3,000 m (3,300–9,800 ft) above sea level. Paranthozela species have been found on both sides of the Andes.

== Species ==
- Paranthozela apicana (Razowski & Pelz, 2008)
- Paranthozela calamistrana (Razowski & Wojtusiak, 2007)
- Paranthozela lobulina (Razowski & Wojtusiak, 2007)
- Paranthozela ochreomixtana (Razowski & Pelz, 2008)
- Paranthozela parva (Razowski & Pelz, 2008)
- Paranthozela polyasterina (Razowski & Wojtusiak, 2007)
- Paranthozela propinquana (Razowski & Pelz, 2008)
- Paranthozela spiloma (Razowski & Wojtusiak, 2007)
- Paranthozela stilbia (Razowski & Wojtusiak, 2007)
- Paranthozela supracalamistrana (Razowski & Pelz, 2008)
- Paranthozela tandayapana (Razowski & Pelz, 2008)
- Paranthozela zopheria (Razowski & Wojtusiak, 2007)

== See also ==
- List of Tortricidae genera
