= Heterochorista chrysonetha =

Scientific classification
- Domain: Eukaryota
- Kingdom: Animalia
- Phylum: Arthropoda
- Class: Insecta
- Order: Lepidoptera
- Family: Tortricidae
- Genus: Heterochorista
- Species: H. chrysonetha

Binomial name
- Heterochorista chrysonetha (Diakonoff, 1953)

Synonyms
- Dicellitis chrysonetha Diakonoff, 1953

Species of moth

Heterochorista chrysonetha is a species of moth of the family Tortricidae. It is found in the Papua province of Indonesia on the island of New Guinea.
