= Protancylis =

Scientific classification
- Kingdom: Animalia
- Phylum: Arthropoda
- Class: Insecta
- Order: Lepidoptera
- Family: Tortricidae
- Tribe: Enarmoniini
- Genus: Protancylis; Diakonoff, 1983

Genus of tortrix moths

Protancylis is a genus of moths belonging to the subfamily Olethreutinae of the family Tortricidae.

== Species ==
- Protancylis amseli Diakonoff, 1983
- Protancylis bisecta Razowski, 2002

== See also ==
- List of Tortricidae genera
