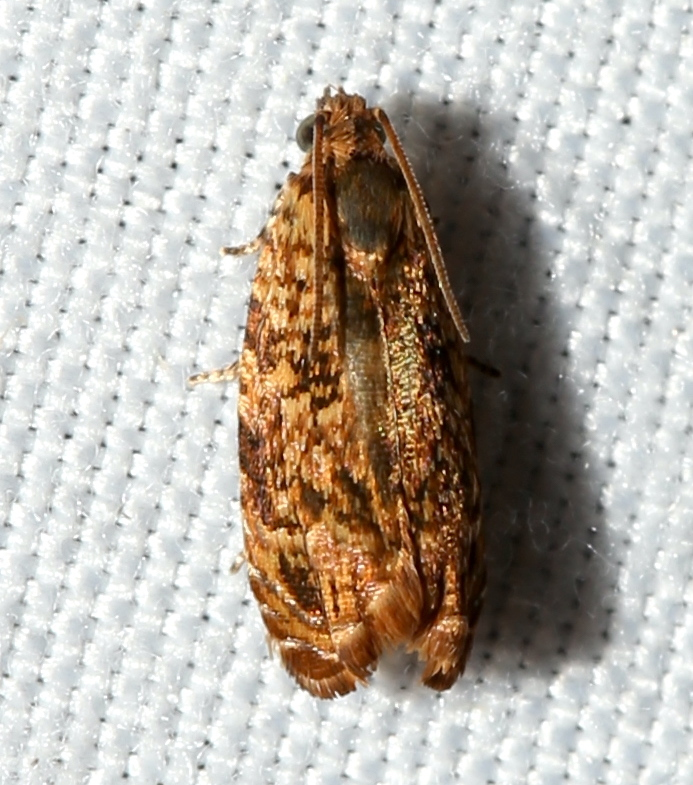

Scientific classification
- Kingdom: Animalia
- Phylum: Arthropoda
- Class: Insecta
- Order: Lepidoptera
- Family: Tortricidae
- Genus: Eucosmomorpha
- Species: E. nearctica

Binomial name
- Eucosmomorpha nearctica Miller, 2002

= Eucosmomorpha nearctica =

Species of moth

Eucosmomorpha nearctica is a moth of the family Tortricidae. It is found in North America, including Kentucky, Michigan, Mississippi, North Carolina and Saskatchewan.

The length of the forewings is 3.8–5.5 mm.
