= Heterochorista inumbrata =

Scientific classification
- Domain: Eukaryota
- Kingdom: Animalia
- Phylum: Arthropoda
- Class: Insecta
- Order: Lepidoptera
- Family: Tortricidae
- Genus: Heterochorista
- Species: H. inumbrata

Binomial name
- Heterochorista inumbrata (Diakonoff, 1953)

Synonyms
- Nikolaia inumbrata Diakonoff, 1953

Species of moth

Heterochorista inumbrata is a species of moth of the family Tortricidae. It is found in Papua New Guinea.
