= Dasodis microphthora =

Scientific classification
- Kingdom: Animalia
- Phylum: Arthropoda
- Class: Insecta
- Order: Lepidoptera
- Family: Tortricidae
- Genus: Dasodis
- Species: D. microphthora

Binomial name
- Dasodis microphthora (Meyrick, 1936)

Synonyms
- Ancylis microphthora Meyrick, 1936; Eumarissa microphthora Clarke, 1976

Species of moth

Dasodis microphthora is a moth of the family Tortricidae first described by Edward Meyrick in 1936. It is found in Sri Lanka, Java and the western Caroline Islands.

== Description ==
Adult male wingspan is 11 mm. Head light cinereous (ash grey). Antenna light fuscous. Palpus cinereous. Thorax pale fuscous grey. Tegula suffused dark grey. Abdomen fuscous grey. Posterior leg whitish ochreous. Forewing oblong suboval and narrow. Costa slightly curved at ends. Apex projecting, pointed. Termen deeply sinuate below apex. Forewings fuscous and cinereous. Cilia light fuscous. Hindwings pale ochreous fuscous with a golden gloss. Cilia pale ochreous.

Larval food plants are Heptapleurum species.
