= Toonavora spermatophaga =

Scientific classification
- Kingdom: Animalia
- Phylum: Arthropoda
- Class: Insecta
- Order: Lepidoptera
- Family: Tortricidae
- Genus: Toonavora
- Species: T. spermatophaga

Binomial name
- Toonavora spermatophaga (Diakonoff & Bradley, 1976)

Synonyms
- Anathamna spermatophaga Diakonoff & Bradley, 1976

Species of moth

Toonavora spermatophaga is a species of moth of the family Tortricidae. It is found in Papua New Guinea.
