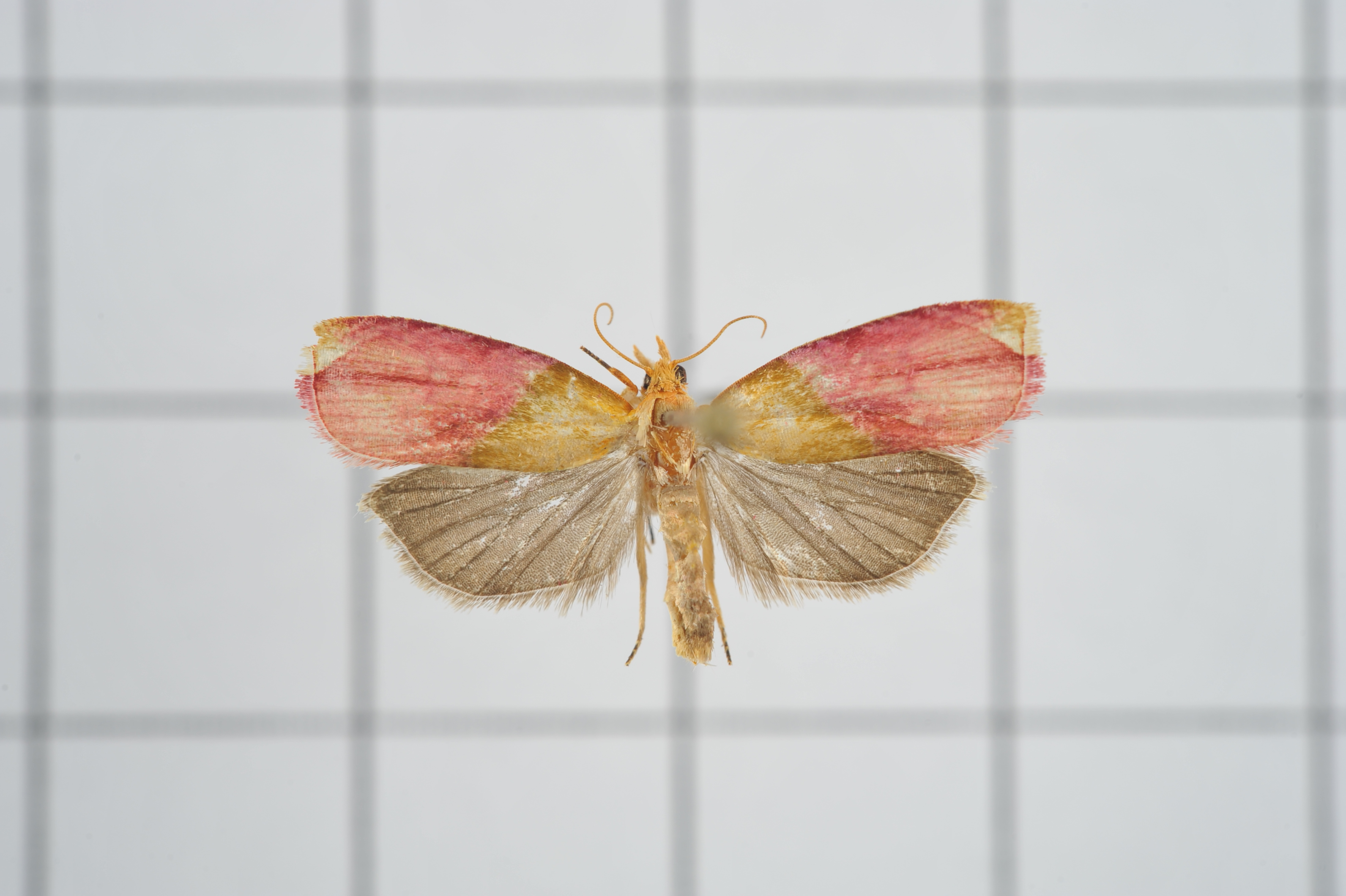
- Costosa rhodantha

Scientific classification
- Kingdom: Animalia
- Phylum: Arthropoda
- Class: Insecta
- Order: Lepidoptera
- Family: Tortricidae
- Genus: Costosa
- Species: C. rhodantha

Binomial name
- Costosa rhodantha (Meyrick, 1907)

= Costosa rhodantha =

Species of moth

Costosa rhodantha is a moth of the family Tortricidae first described by Edward Meyrick in 1907. It is found in Sri Lanka.
