= Enarmoniodes mirabilis =

Scientific classification
- Kingdom: Animalia
- Phylum: Arthropoda
- Class: Insecta
- Order: Lepidoptera
- Family: Tortricidae
- Genus: Enarmoniodes
- Species: E. mirabilis

Binomial name
- Enarmoniodes mirabilis Ghesquière, 1940

Species of moth

Enarmoniodes mirabilis is a species of moth of the family Tortricidae. It is found in the Democratic Republic of Congo.
