= Anthozela =

Scientific classification
- Kingdom: Animalia
- Phylum: Arthropoda
- Class: Insecta
- Order: Lepidoptera
- Family: Tortricidae
- Tribe: Enarmoniini
- Genus: Anthozela; Meyrick, 1913

Genus of tortrix moths

Anthozela is a genus of moths belonging to the subfamily Olethreutinae of the family Tortricidae.

== Species ==
- Anthozela anambrae (Razowski & Wojtusiak, 2012)
- Anthozela anonidii (Ghesquire, 1940)
- Anthozela bathysema (Diakonoff, 1984)
- Anthozela chrysoxantha Meyrick, 1913
- Anthozela cypriflammella (Heppner & Bae, 2018)
- Anthozela daressalami Razowski, 2013
- Anthozela hemidoxa (Meyrick, 1907)
- Anthozela hilaris (Turner, 1916)
- Anthozela macambrarae (Razowski & Wojtusiak, 2014)
- Anthozela postuma (Razowski & Wojtusiak, 2012)
- Anthozela prodiga (Razowski & Wojtusiak, 2012)
- Anthozela psychotriae (Razowski & J.W. Brown, 2012)
- Anthozela usambarae (Razowski & Wojtusiak, 2014)

== See also ==
- List of Tortricidae genera
