= Enarmonia =

- Enarmonia formosana

Scientific classification
- Kingdom: Animalia
- Phylum: Arthropoda
- Clade: Pancrustacea
- Class: Insecta
- Order: Lepidoptera
- Family: Tortricidae
- Tribe: Enarmoniini
- Genus: Enarmonia; Hübner, [1825]

Genus of tortrix moths

Enarmonia is a genus of moths belonging to the subfamily Olethreutinae of the family Tortricidae.

== Species ==
- Enarmonia decor Kawabe, 1978
- Enarmonia flammeata Kuznetzov, 1971
- Enarmonia formosana (Scopoli, 1763)
- Enarmonia major (Walsingham, 1900)
- Enarmonia minuscula Kuznetzov, 1981
- Enarmonia pseudonectis

== See also ==
- List of Tortricidae genera
