= Pternidora koghisiana =

Scientific classification
- Kingdom: Animalia
- Phylum: Arthropoda
- Class: Insecta
- Order: Lepidoptera
- Family: Tortricidae
- Genus: Pternidora
- Species: P. koghisiana

Binomial name
- Pternidora koghisiana Razowski, 2013

Species of moth

Pternidora koghisiana is a species of moth of the family Tortricidae. It is found in New Caledonia in the southwest Pacific Ocean.

The wingspan is about 10 mm.

== Etymology ==
The species name refers to Mount Koghis, the type locality.
