= Heterochorista polysperma =

Scientific classification
- Domain: Eukaryota
- Kingdom: Animalia
- Phylum: Arthropoda
- Class: Insecta
- Order: Lepidoptera
- Family: Tortricidae
- Genus: Heterochorista
- Species: H. polysperma

Binomial name
- Heterochorista polysperma (Diakonoff, 1952)

Synonyms
- Isochorista polysperma Diakonoff, 1952

Species of moth

Heterochorista polysperma is a species of moth of the family Tortricidae. It is found on New Guinea.
