= Neoanathamna =

Scientific classification
- Kingdom: Animalia
- Phylum: Arthropoda
- Class: Insecta
- Order: Lepidoptera
- Family: Tortricidae
- Tribe: Enarmoniini
- Genus: Neoanathamna; Kawabe, 1978

Genus of tortrix moths

Neoanathamna is a genus of moths belonging to the subfamily Olethreutinae of the family Tortricidae.

== Species ==
- Neoanathamna cerinus Kawabe, 1978
- Neoanathamna negligens Kawabe, 1978
- Neoanathamna nipponica (Kawabe, 1976)
- Neoanathamna pallens Kawabe, 1980

== See also ==
- List of Tortricidae genera
