= Eucosmomorpha figurana =

Scientific classification
- Domain: Eukaryota
- Kingdom: Animalia
- Phylum: Arthropoda
- Class: Insecta
- Order: Lepidoptera
- Family: Tortricidae
- Genus: Eucosmomorpha
- Species: E. figurana

Binomial name
- Eucosmomorpha figurana (Kuznetzov, 1997)

Synonyms
- Enarmonia figurana Kuznetzov, 1997

Species of moth

Eucosmomorpha figurana is a moth of the family Tortricidae. It is found in and is possibly endemic to Vietnam.
