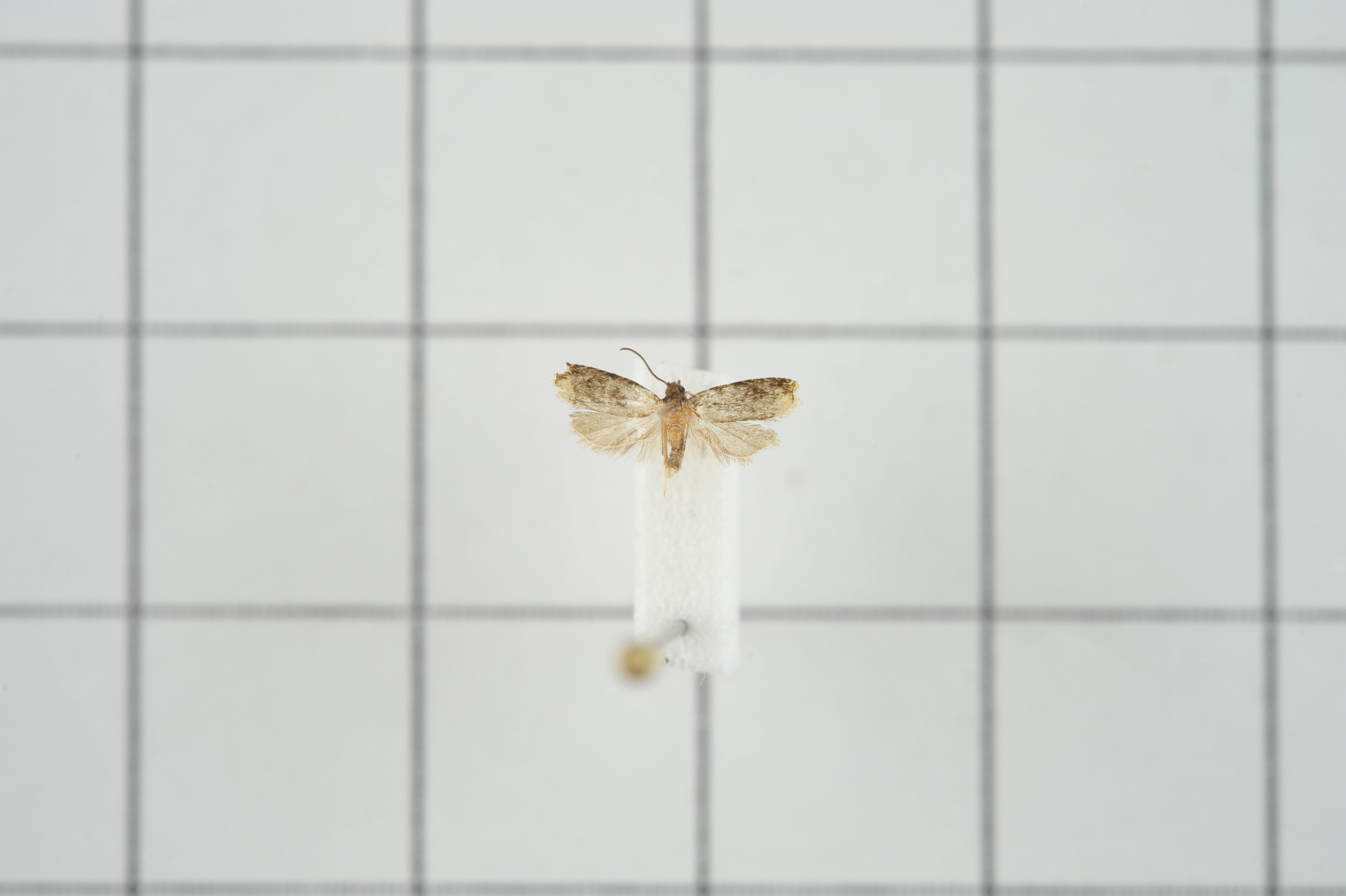

Scientific classification
- Kingdom: Animalia
- Phylum: Arthropoda
- Clade: Pancrustacea
- Class: Insecta
- Order: Lepidoptera
- Family: Tortricidae
- Tribe: Enarmoniini
- Genus: Pseudacroclita; Oku, 1979

= Pseudacroclita =

Genus of tortrix moths

Pseudacroclita is a genus of moths belonging to the family Tortricidae.

== Species ==
- Pseudacroclita hapalaspis (Meyrick, 1931)
- Pseudacroclita luteispecula (Kuznetzov, 1979)

== See also ==
- List of Tortricidae genera
