= Ancylophyes =

Scientific classification
- Kingdom: Animalia
- Phylum: Arthropoda
- Class: Insecta
- Order: Lepidoptera
- Family: Tortricidae
- Tribe: Enarmoniini
- Genus: Ancylophyes; Diakonoff, 1988

Species
- Ancylophyes Diakonoff, 1988 (replacement name for Ancyloides); Diakonoffiella Kuznetzov, 1997 (replacement name for Ancyloides); Argepinotia Razowski & Pelz, 2007

Genus of tortrix moths

Ancylophyes is a genus of moths of the family Tortricidae.

== Species ==
- Ancylophyes atrovirens (Razowski & Wojtusiak, 2008)
- Ancylophyes monochroa Diakonoff, 1984
- Ancylophyes praestabilis Razowski & Wojtusiak, 2012
- Ancylophyes villosa (Razowski & Pelz, 2007)

== See also ==
- List of Tortricidae genera
