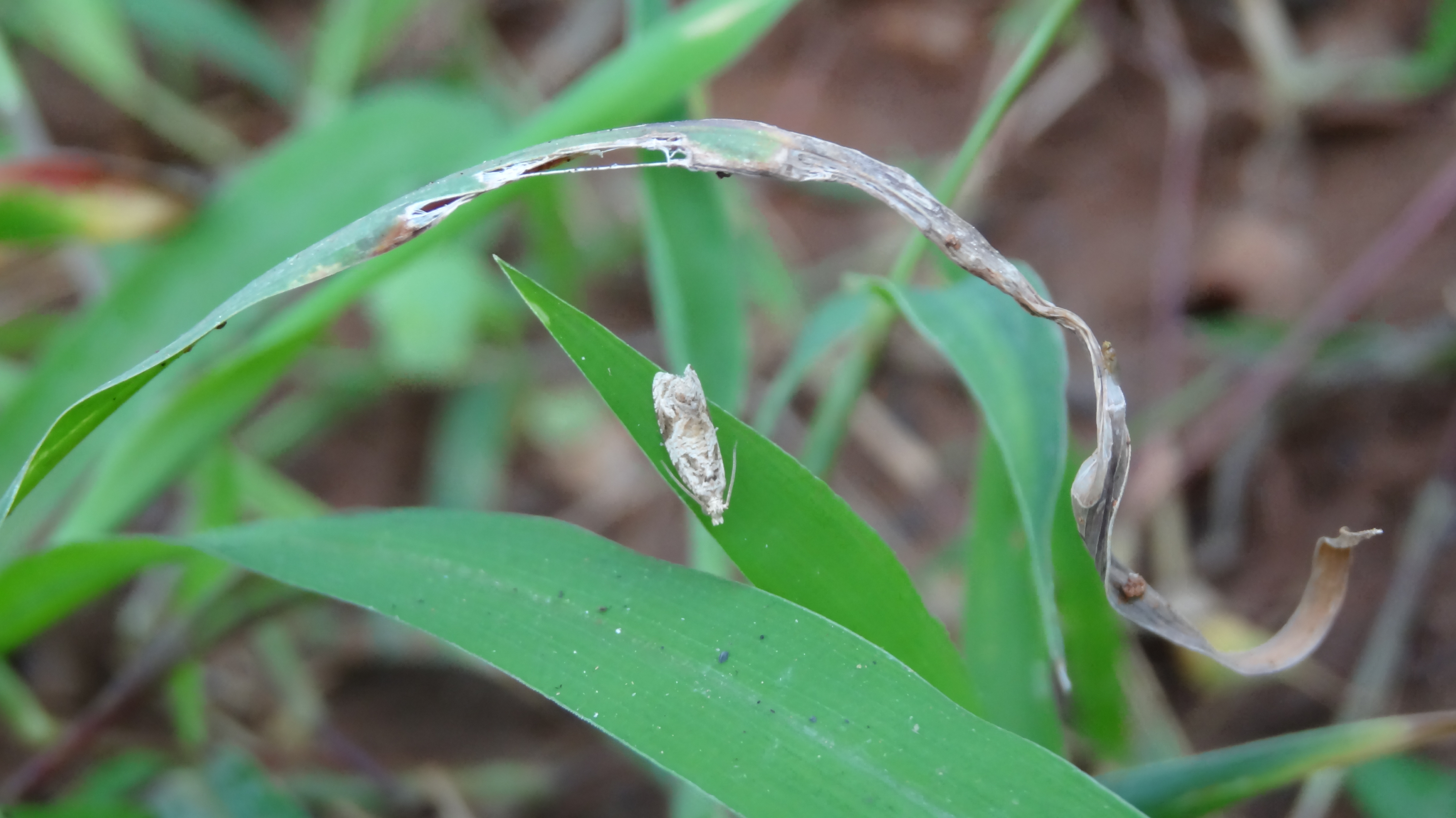
- Loboschiza koenigiana

Scientific classification
- Kingdom: Animalia
- Phylum: Arthropoda
- Class: Insecta
- Order: Lepidoptera
- Family: Tortricidae
- Tribe: Enarmoniini
- Genus: Loboschiza; Diakonoff, 1968

Synonyms
- Rhadinoscolops Obraztsov, 1968

= Loboschiza =

Genus of tortrix moths

Loboschiza is a genus of moths belonging to the subfamily Olethreutinae of the family Tortricidae.

== Species ==
- Loboschiza cinnabaritis (Meyrick, 1928)
- Loboschiza clytocarpa (Meyrick, 1920)
- Loboschiza delomilta (Turner, 1946)
- Loboschiza deloxantha (Turner, 1946)
- Loboschiza exemplaris (Meyrick, 1911)
- Loboschiza furiosa (Meyrick, 1921)
- Loboschiza halysideta (Walsingham in Andrews, 1900)
- Loboschiza hemicosma (Lower, 1908)
- Loboschiza koenigiana (Fabricius, 1775)
- Loboschiza martia (Meyrick, 1911)
- Loboschiza mediana (Walker, 1866)
- Loboschiza thoenarcha (Meyrick, 1911)

== See also ==
- List of Tortricidae genera
