= Aemulatrix aequilibra =

Scientific classification
- Kingdom: Animalia
- Phylum: Arthropoda
- Class: Insecta
- Order: Lepidoptera
- Family: Tortricidae
- Genus: Aemulatrix
- Species: A. aequilibra

Binomial name
- Aemulatrix aequilibra Diakonoff, 1982

Species of moth

Aemulatrix aequilibra is a moth of the family Tortricidae first described by Alexey Diakonoff in 1982. It is found in Sri Lanka.
