= Heterochorista aperta =

Scientific classification
- Domain: Eukaryota
- Kingdom: Animalia
- Phylum: Arthropoda
- Class: Insecta
- Order: Lepidoptera
- Family: Tortricidae
- Genus: Heterochorista
- Species: H. aperta

Binomial name
- Heterochorista aperta (Diakonoff, 1953)

Synonyms
- Nikolaia aperta Diakonoff, 1953

Species of moth

Heterochorista aperta is a species of moth of the family Tortricidae. It is found in New Guinea.
