= Eucosmogastra kontumica =

Scientific classification
- Kingdom: Animalia
- Phylum: Arthropoda
- Class: Insecta
- Order: Lepidoptera
- Family: Tortricidae
- Genus: Eucosmogastra
- Species: E. kontumica

Binomial name
- Eucosmogastra kontumica Razowski, 2009

Species of moth

Eucosmogastra kontumica is a moth of the family Tortricidae. It is found in Vietnam.

The wingspan is 13.5 mm.

== Etymology ==
The specific name refers to the type locality.
