= Heterochorista papuana =

Scientific classification
- Domain: Eukaryota
- Kingdom: Animalia
- Phylum: Arthropoda
- Class: Insecta
- Order: Lepidoptera
- Family: Tortricidae
- Genus: Heterochorista
- Species: H. papuana

Binomial name
- Heterochorista papuana (Diakonoff, 1952)

Synonyms
- Isochorista papuana Diakonoff, 1952

Species of moth

Heterochorista papuana is a species of moth of the family Tortricidae. It is found in Papua, Indonesia, on the island of New Guinea.
