= Thymioptila =

Scientific classification
- Domain: Eukaryota
- Kingdom: Animalia
- Phylum: Arthropoda
- Class: Insecta
- Order: Lepidoptera
- Family: Tortricidae
- Tribe: Enarmoniini
- Genus: Thymioptila; Diakonoff, 1971

Genus of tortrix moths

Thymioptila is a genus of moths belonging to the subfamily Olethreutinae of the family Tortricidae.

== Species ==
- Thymioptila oedalea (Meyrick, 1909)

== See also ==
- List of Tortricidae genera
