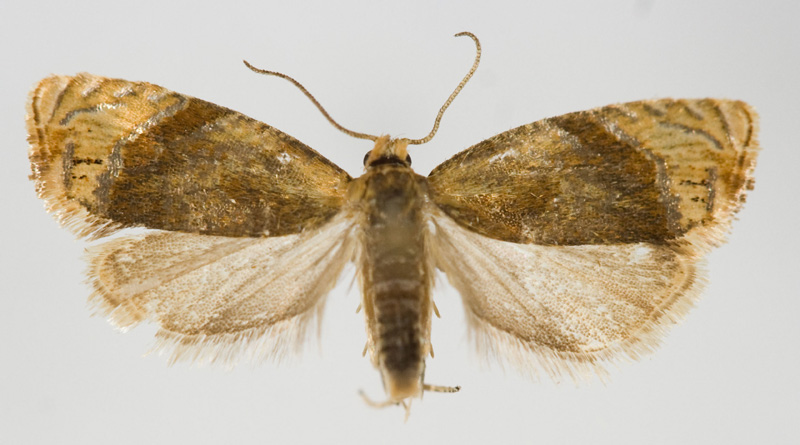

Scientific classification
- Domain: Eukaryota
- Kingdom: Animalia
- Phylum: Arthropoda
- Class: Insecta
- Order: Lepidoptera
- Family: Tortricidae
- Genus: Eucosmomorpha
- Species: E. albersana

Binomial name
- Eucosmomorpha albersana (Hübner, 1813)

Synonyms
- Tortrix albersana Hubner, [1811–1813]; Grapholitha (Laspeyresia) albersana var. ussuriana Caradja, 1916

= Eucosmomorpha albersana =

Species of moth

Eucosmomorpha albersana is a moth of the family Tortricidae. It is found in most of Europe (except Iceland, Ireland, the Iberian Peninsula, most of the Balkan Peninsula and Ukraine), east to the Near East and the eastern part of the Palearctic realm. It is also found in North America.

The wingspan is 13–17 mm. Adults are on wing from May to June. They fly in the afternoon as well as after dark.

The larvae feed on Lonicera species but have also been recorded on Symphoricarpos albus. They spin two leaves together and feed within.
