= Atriscripta arithmetica =

Scientific classification
- Kingdom: Animalia
- Phylum: Arthropoda
- Class: Insecta
- Order: Lepidoptera
- Family: Tortricidae
- Genus: Atriscripta
- Species: A. arithmetica

Binomial name
- Atriscripta arithmetica (Meyrick, 1921)

Synonyms
- Argyroploce arithmetica Meyrick, 1921

Species of moth

Atriscripta arithmetica is a species of moth of the family Tortricidae. It is found in New Caledonia and Australia, where it has been recorded from Queensland. The habitat consists of rainforests, as well as planted forests.

The wingspan is 16–19 mm.
