= Pternidora =

Scientific classification
- Kingdom: Animalia
- Phylum: Arthropoda
- Class: Insecta
- Order: Lepidoptera
- Family: Tortricidae
- Tribe: Enarmoniini
- Genus: Pternidora; Meyrick, 1911

Genus of tortrix moths

Pternidora is a genus of moths belonging to the subfamily Olethreutinae of the family Tortricidae.

== Species ==
- Pternidora koghisiana Razowski, 2013
- Pternidora phloeotis Meyrick, 1911

== See also ==
- List of Tortricidae genera
