= Protancylis bisecta =

Scientific classification
- Kingdom: Animalia
- Phylum: Arthropoda
- Class: Insecta
- Order: Lepidoptera
- Family: Tortricidae
- Genus: Protancylis
- Species: P. bisecta

Binomial name
- Protancylis bisecta Razowski, 2002

Species of moth

Protancylis bisecta is a species of moth of the family Tortricidae. It is found in Cameroon.

The wingspan is about 14 mm.
