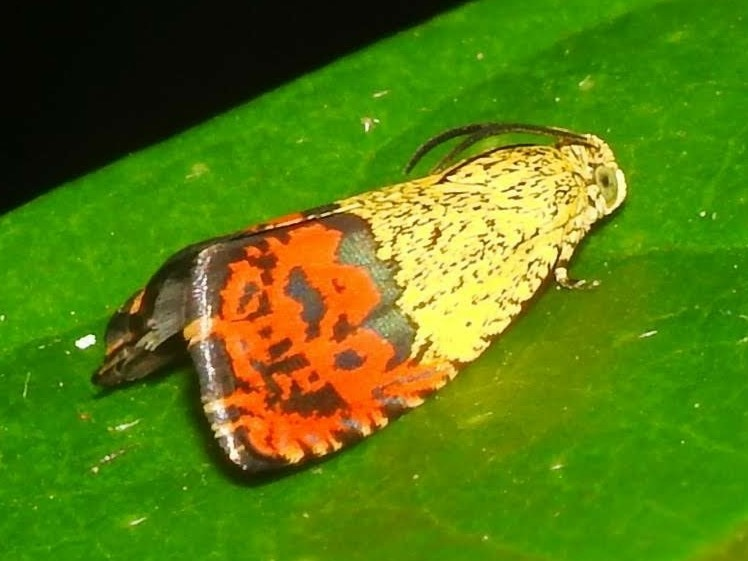

Scientific classification
- Kingdom: Animalia
- Phylum: Arthropoda
- Class: Insecta
- Order: Lepidoptera
- Family: Tortricidae
- Genus: Anthozela
- Species: A. hilaris

Binomial name
- Anthozela hilaris (Turner, 1916)

Synonyms
- Laspeyresia hilaris Turner, 1916

= Anthozela hilaris =

Species of moth

Anthozela hilaris is a species of moth of the family Tortricidae. It is found in Taiwan, Borneo and in Australia, where it has been recorded from Queensland.

The wingspan is about 13 mm. The basal half of the forewings is yellow, irrorated (sprinkled) with blackish and with a dark-fuscous line. Beyond this, the ground colour is dull purple, with dark-fuscous markings edged with red, except for four yellowish costal dots. The hindwings are dark fuscous, partly suffused with pale reddish.
