= Atriscripta =

Scientific classification
- Domain: Eukaryota
- Kingdom: Animalia
- Phylum: Arthropoda
- Class: Insecta
- Order: Lepidoptera
- Family: Tortricidae
- Tribe: Olethreutini
- Genus: Atriscripta; Horak, 2006

Genus of tortrix moths

Atriscripta is a genus of moths of the family Tortricidae.

== Species ==
- Atriscripta arithmetica (Meyrick, 1921)
- Atriscripta decorigera (Diakonoff, 1966)

== See also ==
- List of Tortricidae genera
