= Ancylophyes villosa =

Scientific classification
- Kingdom: Animalia
- Phylum: Arthropoda
- Class: Insecta
- Order: Lepidoptera
- Family: Tortricidae
- Genus: Ancylophyes
- Species: A. villosa

Binomial name
- Ancylophyes villosa (Razowski & Pelz, 2007)

Synonyms
- Argepinotia villosa Razowski & Pelz, 2007

Species of moth

Ancylophyes villosa is a species of moth of the family Tortricidae. It is found in northern Argentina.
