= Periphoeba palmodes =

Scientific classification
- Kingdom: Animalia
- Phylum: Arthropoda
- Class: Insecta
- Order: Lepidoptera
- Family: Tortricidae
- Genus: Periphoeba
- Species: P. palmodes

Binomial name
- Periphoeba palmodes (Meyrick, 1920)

Synonyms
- Eucosma palmodes Meyrick, 1920; Periphoeba adluminana Bradley, 1957; Eucosma trepida Meyrick, 1911

Species of moth

Periphoeba palmodes is a moth of the family Tortricidae first described by Edward Meyrick in 1920. It is found in Sri Lanka.
