= Anathamna megalozona =

Scientific classification
- Kingdom: Animalia
- Phylum: Arthropoda
- Clade: Pancrustacea
- Class: Insecta
- Order: Lepidoptera
- Family: Tortricidae
- Genus: Anathamna
- Species: A. megalozona

Binomial name
- Anathamna megalozona Meyrick, 1916

Species of moth

Anathamna megalozona is a moth of the family Tortricidae first described by Edward Meyrick in 1916. It is found in Sri Lanka and Kerala.
