= Dacgleia =

Scientific classification
- Kingdom: Animalia
- Phylum: Arthropoda
- Class: Insecta
- Order: Lepidoptera
- Family: Tortricidae
- Genus: Dacgleia; Razowski, 2009
- Species: D. cerata

Binomial name
- Dacgleia cerata Razowski, 2009

Genus of moths

Dacgleia is a genus of moths belonging to the subfamily Olethreutinae of the family Tortricidae. It contains only one species, Dacgleia cerata, which is found in Vietnam.

The wingspan is 17 mm.

== Etymology ==
The name of the genus refers to Dac Glei, the type locality of the type species. The specific name refers to the shape of uncus and socii and is derived from Latin ceratus (meaning with horns).

== See also ==
- List of Tortricidae genera
