= Marianne Horak =

Swiss-Australian entomologist

Marianne Horak AO (born 1944) is a Swiss-Australian entomologist who specialises in Australian Lepidoptera, particularly the phycitine and tortricid moths, and is considered one of the worldwide leading experts on the systematics of Tortricidae.

== Education and career ==
Horak studied at the Federal Institute of Technology (ETH) in Zürich, earning her M.Sc. in 1970 and Ph.D. in 1983. She did extensive field work in New Zealand (1967–69), New Guinea (1971–73), and Indonesia (1985) before settling permanently in Australia. Horak has discovered several new species of Lepidoptera, including multiple species of Cadra, Heterochorista, and Ogmograptis, and did research on the scribbly gum moths, during which eleven new species of Ogmograptis were discovered. She also is the taxon authority for several genera, including Aglaogonia, Atriscripta, and Cnecidophora. She is the current editor-in-chief of Monographs of Australian Lepidoptera, chairperson of the Australian Lepidoptera Research Endowment, and honorary research fellow in Lepidoptera systematics at the Australian National Insect Collection at CSIRO, where she works as Lepidoptera curator and was head of Lepidoptera research until her retirement in 2010.

=== Awards and dedicated species ===
Horak was the first recipient of the J. O. Westwood Medal for excellence in insect taxonomy for "her outstanding monograph entitled The Olethreutine Moths of Australia (Lepidoptera: Tortricidae)", and appointed an Officer of the Order of Australia in the 2023 King's Birthday Honours for "distinguished service to entomology, to taxonomic and phylogenetic research, and to philanthropic endeavours". The moth species Coleophora horakae, Hilarographa mariannae, and Myrtartona mariannae are dedicated to her.

== Personal life ==
Horak was born in Glarus, Switzerland in 1944. She was previously married to the Austrian mycologist Egon Horak.
