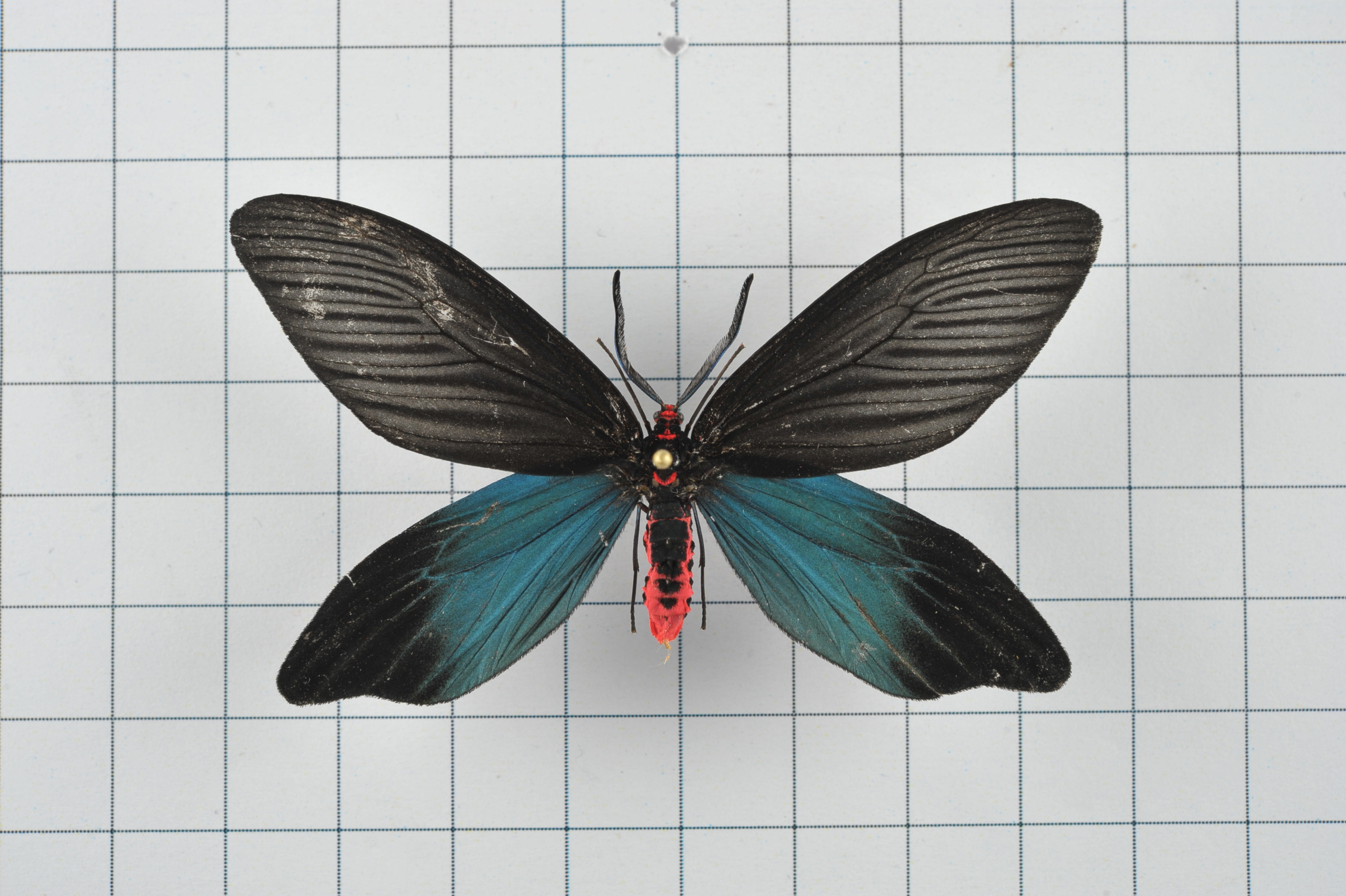

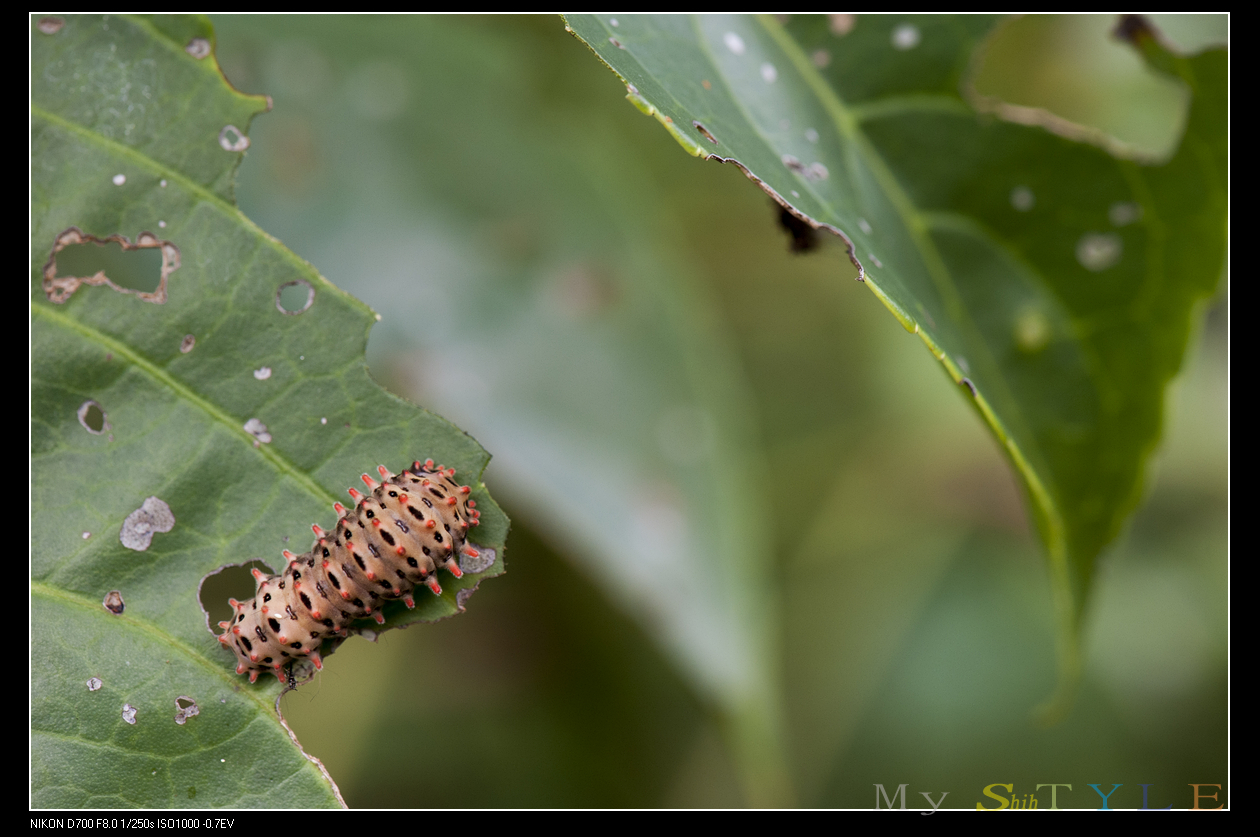

Scientific classification
- Domain: Eukaryota
- Kingdom: Animalia
- Phylum: Arthropoda
- Class: Insecta
- Order: Lepidoptera
- Family: Zygaenidae
- Genus: Histia
- Species: H. flabellicornis

Binomial name
- Histia flabellicornis (Fabricius, 1775)

Synonyms
- Zygaena flabellicornis Fabricius, 1775; Histia rhodope f. albimacula Hampson, 1892; Histia anobia Dohrn, 1899; Gynautocera libelluloides Herrich-Schäffer, 1850; Histia nigrina Jordan, 1907; Histia selene Walker, 1854; Histia vacillans Walker, 1854

= Histia flabellicornis =

Species of moth

Histia flabellicornis is a moth in the family Zygaenidae. It was described by Johan Christian Fabricius in 1775. It is found in Asia. It has been recorded feeding on Bischofia trifoliata.

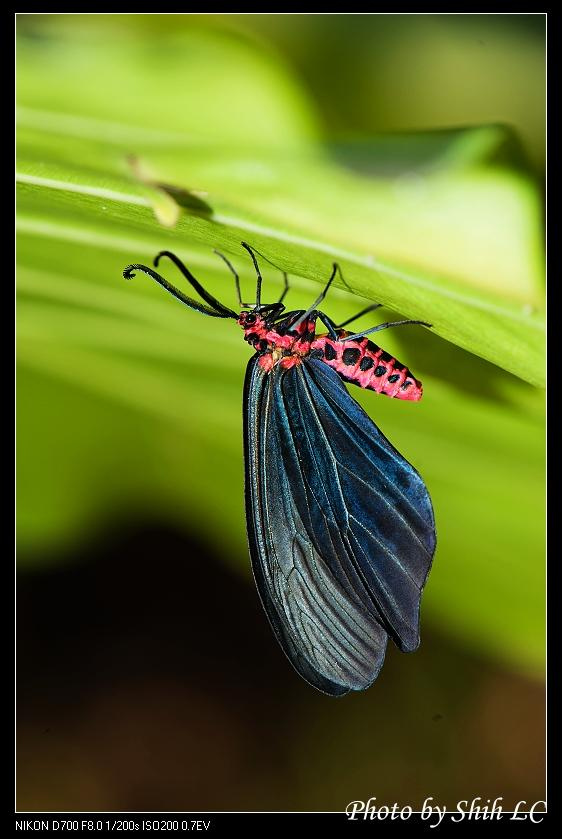
Histia flabellicornis ultima

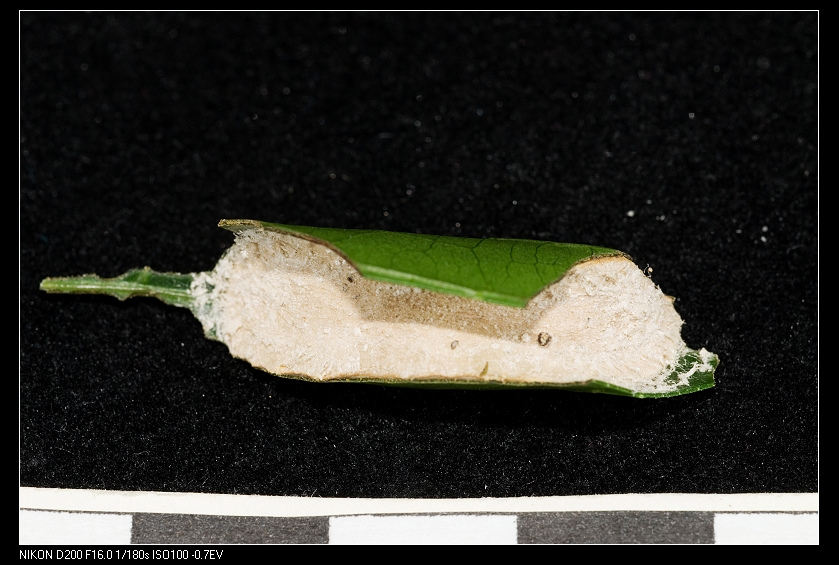
Histia flabellicornis ultima feeding damage

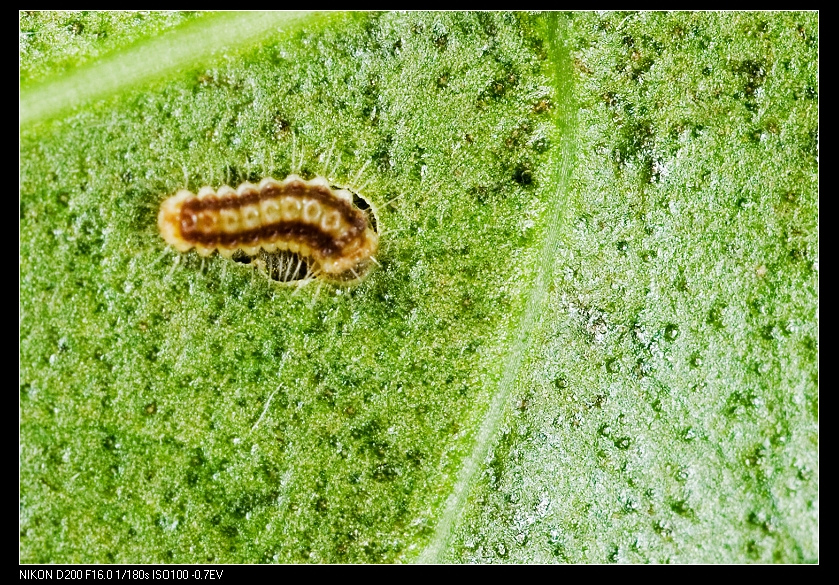
Histia flabellicornis ultima larva

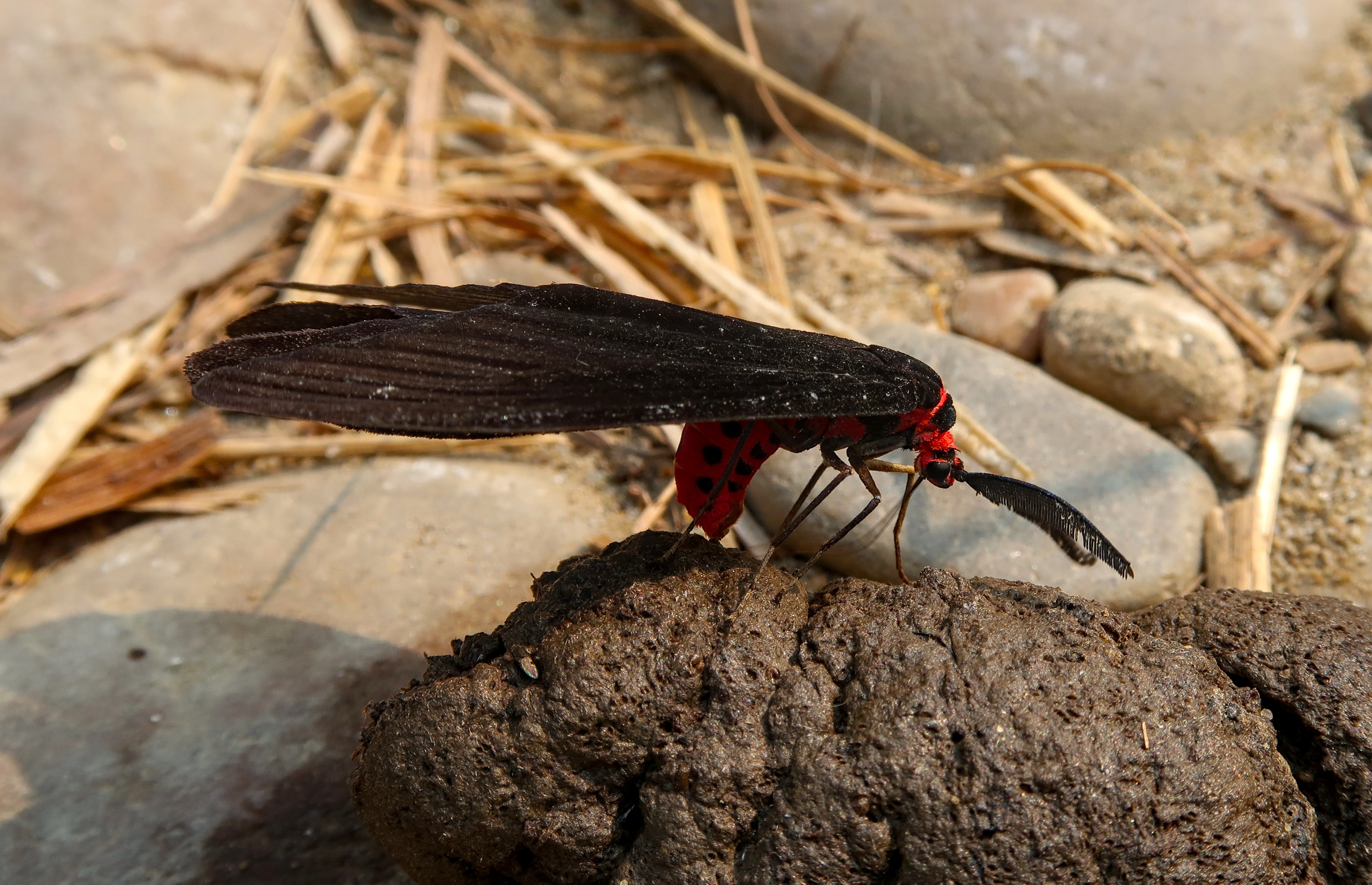
Histia flabellicornis at Chitwan National Park

== Subspecies ==
- Histia flabellicornis flabellicornis
- Histia flabellicornis atrovirens Inoue, 1992 (Japan)
- Histia flabellicornis angustimargo Hering, 1925 (Sumatra)
- Histia flabellicornis azurea Inoue, 1992 (Japan)
- Histia flabellicornis catobia Dohrn, 1899 (Sumatra)
- Histia flabellicornis cometaris Butler, 1882
- Histia flabellicornis libelluloides (Herrich-Schäffer, 1850) (Java)
- Histia flabellicornis lombokensis Rothschild, 1899 (Lombok)
- Histia flabellicornis niasica Dohrn, 1899 (Nias)
- Histia flabellicornis nilgira Moore, 1879 (southern India)
- Histia flabellicornis obsoleta Inoue, 1992 (Japan)
- Histia flabellicornis sumatrana Rothschild, 1899 (Sumatra)
- Histia flabellicornis sumbawana Hering, 1922 (Sumbawa)
- Histia flabellicornis tahanica Jordan, 1907 (Malakka)
- Histia flabellicornis ultima Hering, 1922 (Taiwan)
