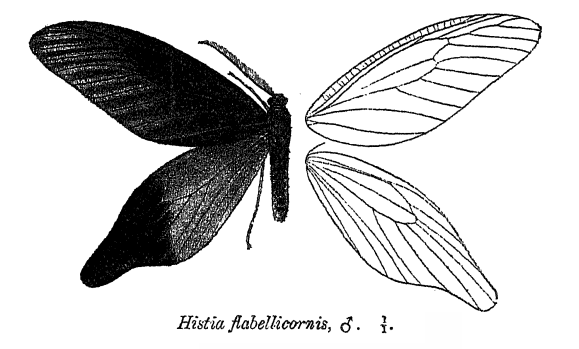

Scientific classification
- Kingdom: Animalia
- Phylum: Arthropoda
- Clade: Pancrustacea
- Class: Insecta
- Order: Lepidoptera
- Family: Zygaenidae
- Subfamily: Chalcosiinae
- Genus: Histia; Hübner, 1820

= Histia =

Genus of moths

Histia is a genus of moths of the family Zygaenidae.

== Selected species ==
- Histia flabellicornis Fabricius, 1775
- Histia libelluloides Herrich-Schäffer, 1850
- Histia rhodope
