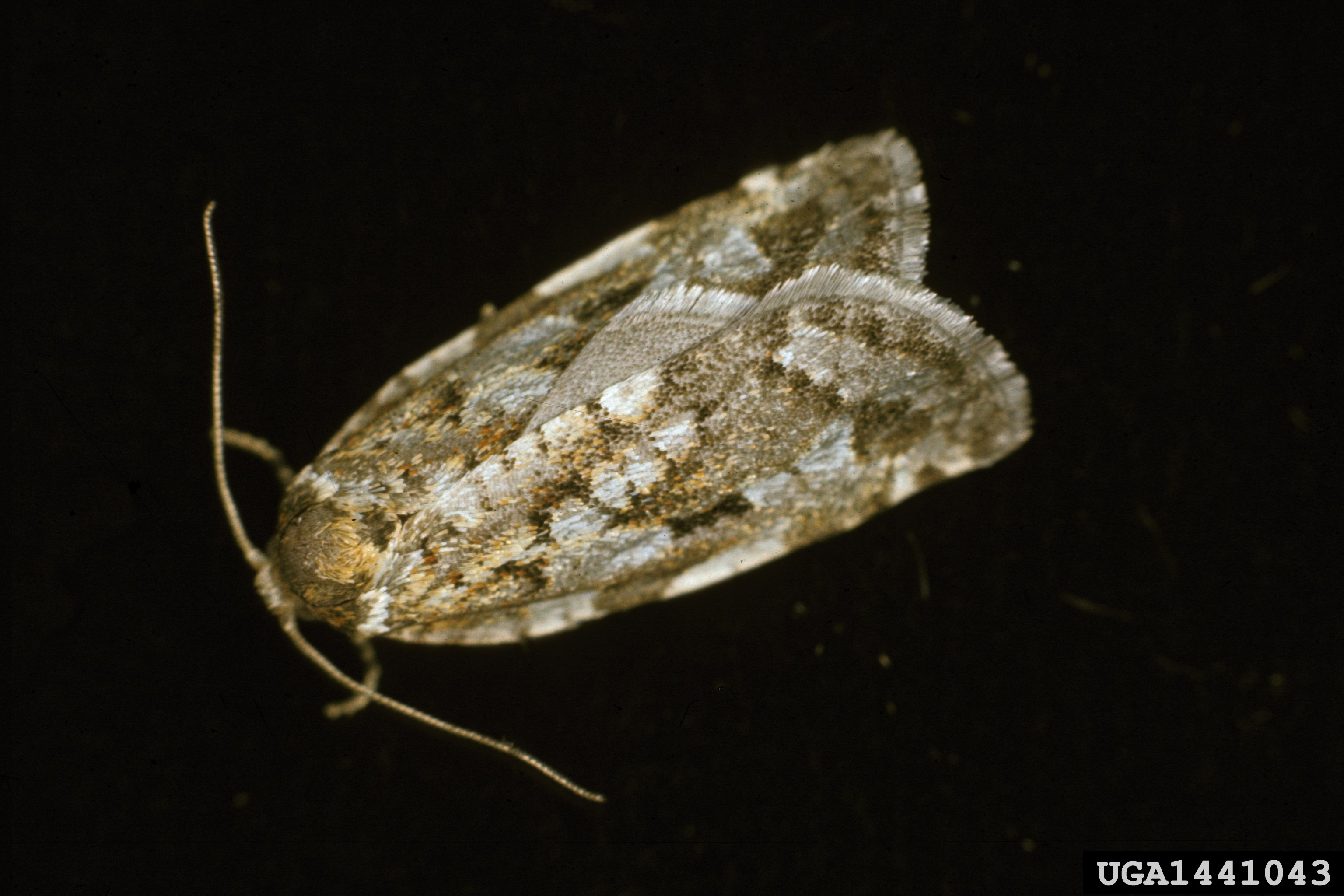

Scientific classification
- Domain: Eukaryota
- Kingdom: Animalia
- Phylum: Arthropoda
- Class: Insecta
- Order: Lepidoptera
- Family: Tortricidae
- Genus: Choristoneura
- Species: C. occidentalis

Binomial name
- Choristoneura occidentalis (Walsingham, 1891)

Synonyms
- Cacoecia occidentalis Walsingham, 1891; Archips occidentalis (Walsingham, 1891)

= Choristoneura occidentalis =

Species of moth

For the Western spruce bud worm, elsewhere as the homonym Choristoneura occidentalis, please see Choristoneura freemani

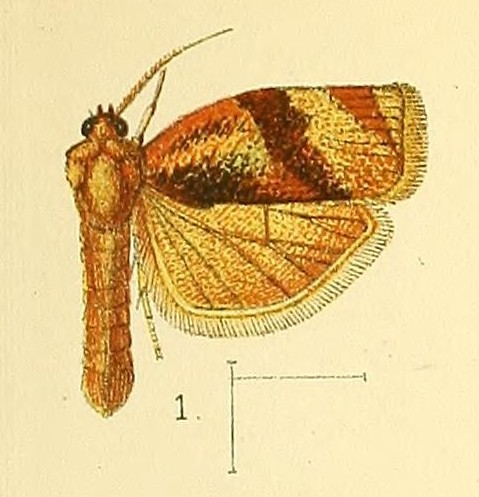
Choristoneura occidentalis

Archips occidentalis [or Choristoneura occidentalis in some schemes] is a species of moth of the family Tortricidae. It is found in the Gambia, and possibly more broadly, such as Democratic Republic of Congo, Tanzania, and South Africa.

The larvae feed on Maesopsis eminii, Pinus patula, Vigna unguiculata, Allium cepa, Cajanus, Citrus (including Citrus aurantium), Coffea (including Coffea arabica), Corchorus, Cupressus lusitanica, Eucalyptus camaldulensis, Eucalyptus torelliana, Glycine max and Gossypium species.
