= Choristoneura heliaspis =

Scientific classification
- Kingdom: Animalia
- Phylum: Arthropoda
- Class: Insecta
- Order: Lepidoptera
- Family: Tortricidae
- Genus: Choristoneura
- Species: C. heliaspis

Binomial name
- Choristoneura heliaspis (Meyrick, 1909)

Synonyms
- Cacoecia heliaspis Meyrick, 1909; Archips heliaspis

Species of moth

Choristoneura heliaspis is a species of moth of the family Tortricidae. It is found in Ethiopia, Nigeria, South Africa and Mozambique.
