= Choristoneura quadratica =

Scientific classification
- Domain: Eukaryota
- Kingdom: Animalia
- Phylum: Arthropoda
- Class: Insecta
- Order: Lepidoptera
- Family: Tortricidae
- Genus: Choristoneura
- Species: C. quadratica

Binomial name
- Choristoneura quadratica Diakonoff, 1955

Species of moth

Choristoneura quadratica is a species of moth of the family Tortricidae. It is found in Nepal.
