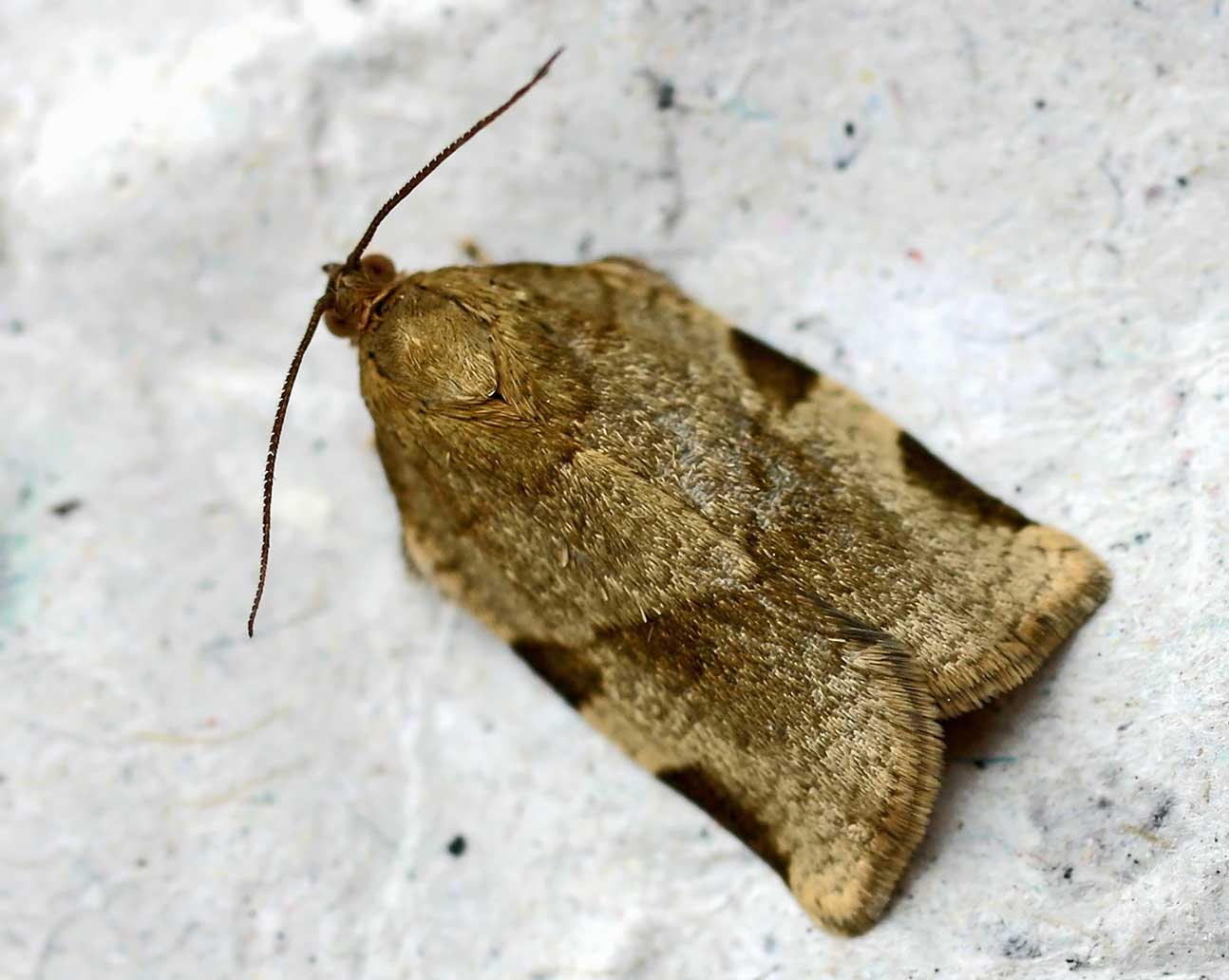
- Mountain-ash tortricid Choristoneura hebenstreitella

Scientific classification
- Kingdom: Animalia
- Phylum: Arthropoda
- Clade: Pancrustacea
- Class: Insecta
- Order: Lepidoptera
- Family: Tortricidae
- Subfamily: Tortricinae
- Tribe: Archipini
- Genus: Choristoneura; Lederer, 1859

Species
- Several, see text

Synonyms
- Cornicacoecia Obraztsov, 1954; Hoshinoa Kawabe, 1965

= Choristoneura =

Genus of tortrix moths

Choristoneura is a genus of moths in the family Tortricidae. Several species are serious pests of conifers, such as spruce and are known as spruce budworms.

== Species ==
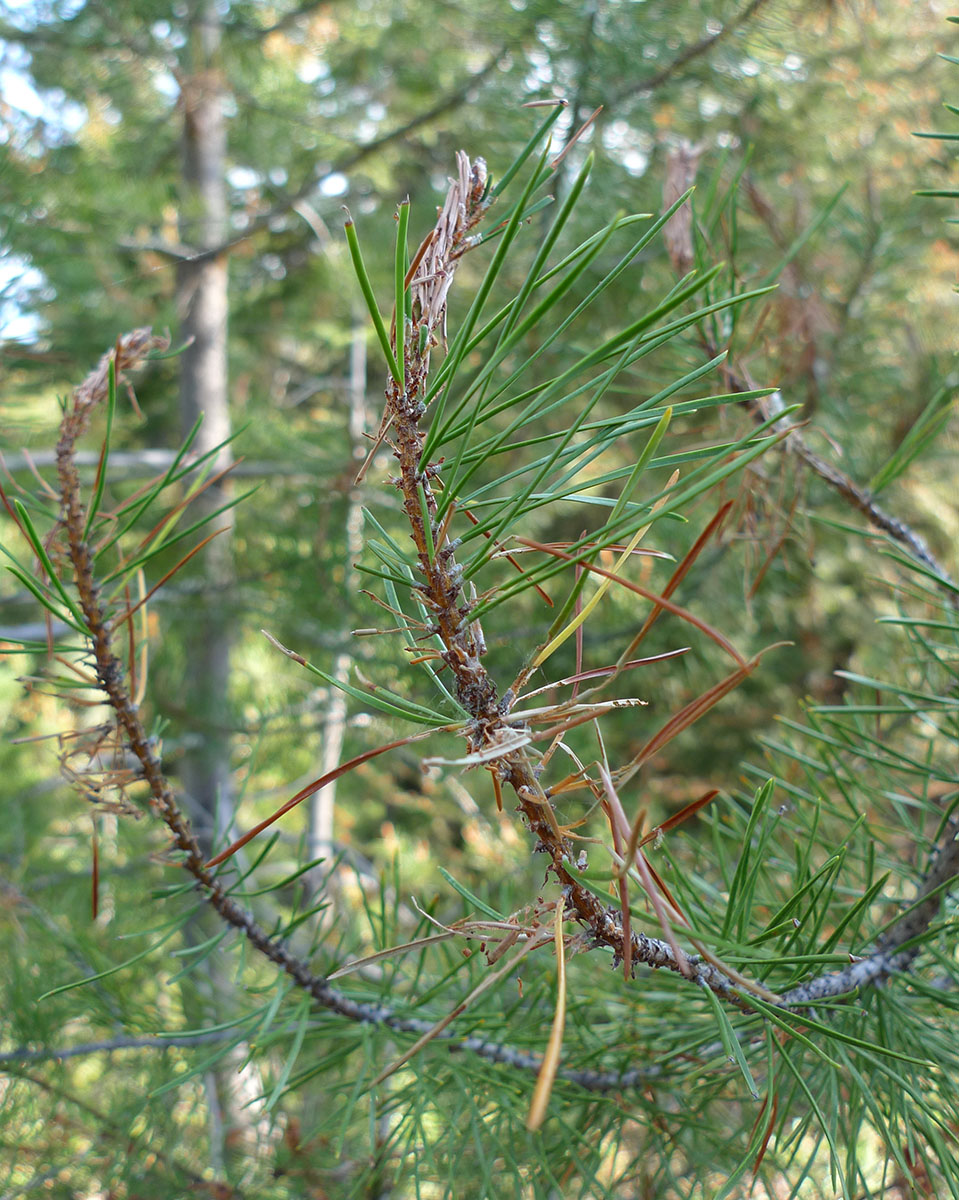
Western spruce budworm (Choristoneura freemani) attacking Lodgepole pine (Pinus contorta) on Blewett Pass in Washington State

- Choristoneura adumbratanus (Walsingham, 1900)
- Choristoneura africana Razowski, 2002
- Choristoneura albaniana (Walker, 1863)
- Choristoneura argentifasciata Heppner, 1989
- Choristoneura biennis Freeman, 1967
- Choristoneura bracatana (Rebel, in Rebel & Rogenhofer, 1894)
- Choristoneura carnana (Barnes & Busck, 1920)
- Choristoneura chapana Razowski, 2008
- Choristoneura colyma Razowski, 2006
- Choristoneura conflictana (Walker, 1863)
- Choristoneura diversana (Hubner, [1814-1817])
- Choristoneura evanidana (Kennel, 1901)
- Choristoneura expansiva X.P.Wang & G.J.Yang, 2008
- Choristoneura ferrugininotata Obraztsov, 1968
- Choristoneura fractivittana (Clemens, 1865)
- Choristoneura freemani Razowski, 2008, western spruce budworm
- Choristoneura fumiferana (Clemens, 1865), eastern spruce budworm
- Choristoneura griseicoma (Meyrick, 1924)
- Choristoneura hebenstreitella (Muller, 1764), mountain-ash tortricid
- Choristoneura heliaspis (Meyrick, 1909)
- Choristoneura improvisana (Kuznetsov, 1973)
- Choristoneura irina Syachina & Budashkin, 2007
- Choristoneura jecorana (Kennel, 1899)
- Choristoneura jezoensis Yasuda & Suzuki, 1987
- Choristoneura lafauryana (Ragonot, 1875)
- Choristoneura lambertiana (Busck, 1915)
- Choristoneura longicellanus (Walsingham, 1900)
- Choristoneura luticostana (Christoph, 1888)
- Choristoneura metasequoiacola Liu, 1983
- Choristoneura murinana (Hubner, [1796-1799])
- Choristoneura neurophaea (Meyrick, 1932)
- Choristoneura obsoletana (Walker, 1863)
- Choristoneura occidentalis (Walsingham, 1891)
- Choristoneura orae Freeman, 1967
- Choristoneura palladinoi Razowski & Trematerra, 2010
- Choristoneura parallela (Robinson, 1869)
- Choristoneura pinus Freeman, 1953, jack pine budworm
- Choristoneura propensa Razowski, 1992
- Choristoneura psoricodes (Meyrick, 1911)
- Choristoneura quadratica Diakonoff, 1955
- Choristoneura retiniana (Walsingham, 1879)
- Choristoneura rosaceana (Harris, 1841)
- Choristoneura simonyi (Rebel, 1892)
- Choristoneura spaldingana Obraztsov, 1962
- Choristoneura thyrsifera Razowski, 1984
- Choristoneura zapulata (Robinson, 1869)
