= Choristoneura biennis =

Scientific classification
- Domain: Eukaryota
- Kingdom: Animalia
- Phylum: Arthropoda
- Class: Insecta
- Order: Lepidoptera
- Family: Tortricidae
- Genus: Choristoneura
- Species: C. biennis

Binomial name
- Choristoneura biennis Freeman, 1967

Species of moth

Choristoneura biennis, the two-year-cycle budworm moth, is a species of moth of the family Tortricidae. It is found in Canada, where it has been recorded from Alberta and British Columbia.

The wingspan is about 26 mm. Adults have been recorded on wing in July.

The larvae feed on Abies lasiocarpa, Picea engelmanni and Picea glauca.
