= Choristoneura irina =

Scientific classification
- Domain: Eukaryota
- Kingdom: Animalia
- Phylum: Arthropoda
- Class: Insecta
- Order: Lepidoptera
- Family: Tortricidae
- Genus: Choristoneura
- Species: C. irina

Binomial name
- Choristoneura irina Syachina & Budashkin, 2007

Species of moth

Choristoneura irina is a species of moth of the family Tortricidae. It is found in Khabarovsk Krai, Russia.
