= Choristoneura psoricodes =

Scientific classification
- Kingdom: Animalia
- Phylum: Arthropoda
- Class: Insecta
- Order: Lepidoptera
- Family: Tortricidae
- Genus: Choristoneura
- Species: C. psoricodes

Binomial name
- Choristoneura psoricodes (Meyrick, 1911)

Synonyms
- Tortrix psoricodes Meyrick, 1911; Epichoristodes psoricodes

Species of moth

Choristoneura psoricodes is a species of moth of the family Tortricidae. It is found in South Africa.

The wingspan is 19.5 mm for males and 21–23 mm for females.
