= Choristoneura propensa =

Scientific classification
- Kingdom: Animalia
- Phylum: Arthropoda
- Class: Insecta
- Order: Lepidoptera
- Family: Tortricidae
- Genus: Choristoneura
- Species: C. propensa

Binomial name
- Choristoneura propensa Razowski, 1992

Species of moth

Choristoneura propensa is a species of moth of the family Tortricidae. It is found in Afghanistan.
