= Choristoneura argentifasciata =

Scientific classification
- Kingdom: Animalia
- Phylum: Arthropoda
- Clade: Pancrustacea
- Class: Insecta
- Order: Lepidoptera
- Family: Tortricidae
- Genus: Choristoneura
- Species: C. argentifasciata

Binomial name
- Choristoneura argentifasciata Heppner, 1989

Species of moth

Choristoneura argentifasciata is a species of moth of the family Tortricidae. It is found in the United States, where it has been recorded from Florida, Georgia, Louisiana, Mississippi and Texas.

The length of the forewings is 6–7 mm for males and 7.4-8.2 mm for females. Adults have been recorded on wing from March to August.
