= Choristoneura zapulata =

Scientific classification
- Domain: Eukaryota
- Kingdom: Animalia
- Phylum: Arthropoda
- Class: Insecta
- Order: Lepidoptera
- Family: Tortricidae
- Genus: Choristoneura
- Species: C. zapulata

Binomial name
- Choristoneura zapulata (Robinson, 1869)

Synonyms
- Tortrix zapulata Robinson, 1869; Tortrix symphoricarpana Kearfott, 1905

Species of moth

Choristoneura zapulata, the zapulata moth, is a moth of the family Tortricidae. The species was first described by Robinson in 1869. It is found in North America, where it has been recorded from British Columbia to Quebec, south to California, Illinois and Pennsylvania.

The wingspan is 20–27 mm. Adults have been recorded on wing from May to September.

The larvae feed on Alnus, Symphoricarpos, Vaccinium, Trifolium, Ceanothus, Fragaria and Rosa species, as well as Betula papyrifera, Comptonia peregrina Prunus virginiana, Populus tremuloides and Arctostaphylos manzanita.
