= Choristoneura ferrugininotata =

Scientific classification
- Domain: Eukaryota
- Kingdom: Animalia
- Phylum: Arthropoda
- Class: Insecta
- Order: Lepidoptera
- Family: Tortricidae
- Genus: Choristoneura
- Species: C. ferrugininotata

Binomial name
- Choristoneura ferrugininotata Obraztsov, 1968

Species of moth

Choristoneura ferrugininotata is a species of moth of the family Tortricidae. It is found in the north-western Himalayas in India.
