= Choristoneura colyma =

Scientific classification
- Domain: Eukaryota
- Kingdom: Animalia
- Phylum: Arthropoda
- Class: Insecta
- Order: Lepidoptera
- Family: Tortricidae
- Genus: Choristoneura
- Species: C. colyma

Binomial name
- Choristoneura colyma Razowski, 2006

Species of moth

Choristoneura colyma is a species of moth of the family Tortricidae. It is found in Jammu and Kashmir, India.

The wingspan is about 20 mm.
