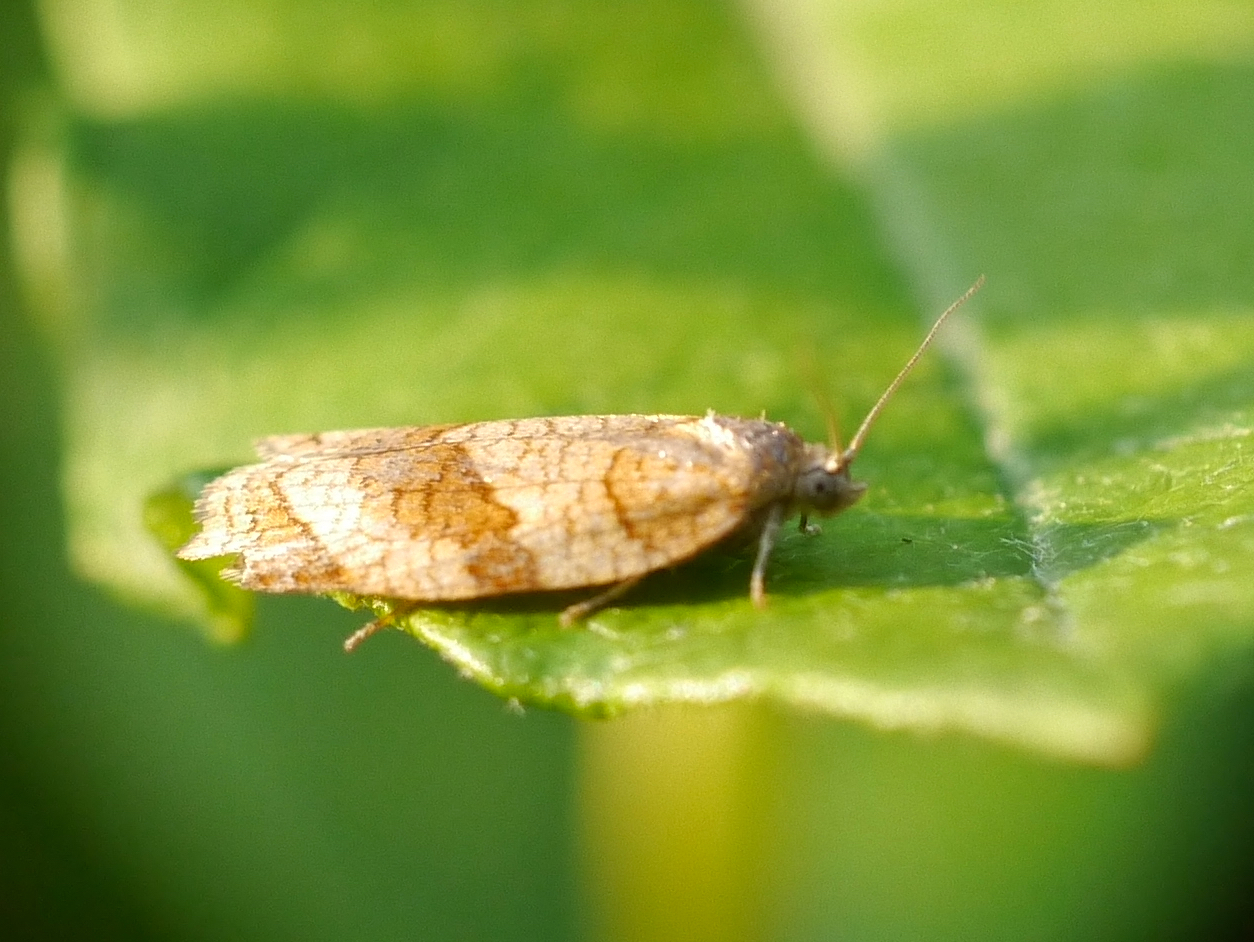

Scientific classification
- Kingdom: Animalia
- Phylum: Arthropoda
- Class: Insecta
- Order: Lepidoptera
- Family: Tortricidae
- Genus: Choristoneura
- Species: C. albaniana

Binomial name
- Choristoneura albaniana (Walker, 1863)

Synonyms
- Teras albaniana Walker, 1863; Pandemis albariana Barrett, 1887; Tortrix arcticana Moschler, 1874; Tortrix kukakana Kearfott, 1907; Tortrix lapponana Tengstrom, 1869

= Choristoneura albaniana =

Species of moth

Choristoneura albaniana is a species of moth in the family Tortricidae. It was first described by Francis Walker in 1863.

The larvae feed on Prunus pennsylvanica and Larix species.
