= Choristoneura jecorana =

Scientific classification
- Domain: Eukaryota
- Kingdom: Animalia
- Phylum: Arthropoda
- Class: Insecta
- Order: Lepidoptera
- Family: Tortricidae
- Genus: Choristoneura
- Species: C. jecorana

Binomial name
- Choristoneura jecorana (Kennel, 1899)

Synonyms
- Tortrix Pandemis jecorana Kennel, 1899

Species of moth

Choristoneura jecorana is a species of moth of the family Tortricidae. It is found in Iran.
