= Choristoneura expansiva =

Scientific classification
- Domain: Eukaryota
- Kingdom: Animalia
- Phylum: Arthropoda
- Class: Insecta
- Order: Lepidoptera
- Family: Tortricidae
- Genus: Choristoneura
- Species: C. expansiva

Binomial name
- Choristoneura expansiva X.P.Wang & G.J.Yang, 2008

Species of moth

Choristoneura expansiva is a species of moth of the family Tortricidae. It is found in Fujian, China.

The length of the forewings is 17–18.5 mm for males and 25–26.5 mm for females.
