= Choristoneura carnana =

Scientific classification
- Domain: Eukaryota
- Kingdom: Animalia
- Phylum: Arthropoda
- Class: Insecta
- Order: Lepidoptera
- Family: Tortricidae
- Genus: Choristoneura
- Species: C. carnana

Binomial name
- Choristoneura carnana (Barnes & Busck, 1920)

Synonyms
- Tortrix carnana Barnes & Busck, 1920

Species of moth

Choristoneura carnana is a species of moth of the family Tortricidae first described by William Barnes and August Busck in 1920. It is found in the United States, where it has been recorded from California and Colorado.

The wingspan is 20–21 mm. Adults have been recorded on wing from May to September.

The larvae feed on Abies concolor, Pseudotsuga macrocarpa, Pseudotsuga menziesii and Pseudotsuga macrocarpa.

== Subspecies ==
- Choristoneura carnana carnana
- Choristoneura carnana californica Powell, 1964
