= Choristoneura jezoensis =

Scientific classification
- Kingdom: Animalia
- Phylum: Arthropoda
- Clade: Pancrustacea
- Class: Insecta
- Order: Lepidoptera
- Family: Tortricidae
- Genus: Choristoneura
- Species: C. jezoensis

Binomial name
- Choristoneura jezoensis Yasuda & Suzuki, 1987

Species of moth

Choristoneura jezoensis is a species of moth of the family Tortricidae. It is found on Hokkaido island in Japan.

The larvae feed on Abies sachalinensis, Picea jezoensis and Larix leptolepis.
