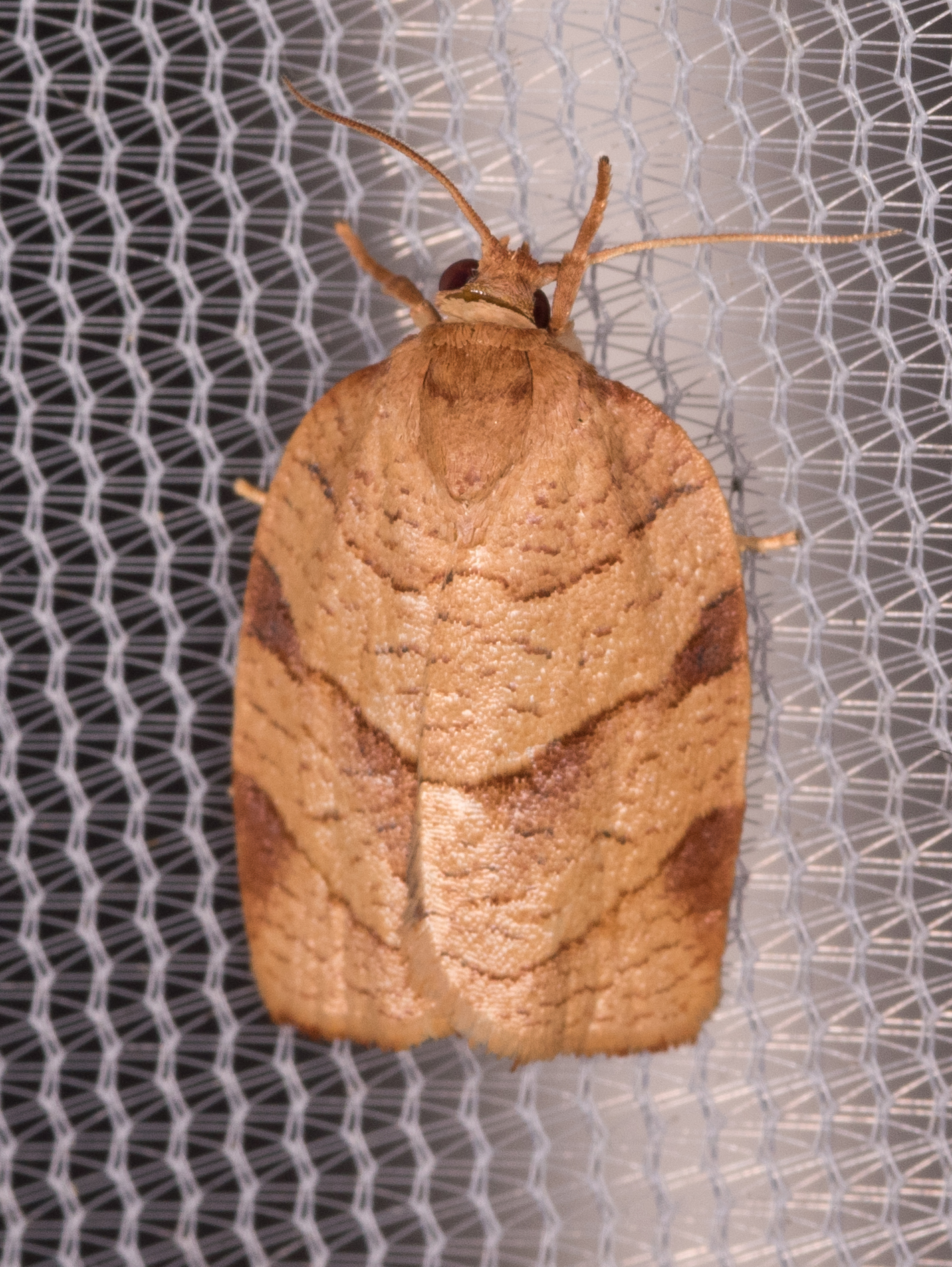

Scientific classification
- Kingdom: Animalia
- Phylum: Arthropoda
- Class: Insecta
- Order: Lepidoptera
- Family: Tortricidae
- Genus: Choristoneura
- Species: C. obsoletana

Binomial name
- Choristoneura obsoletana (Walker, 1863)

Synonyms
- Tortrix obsoletana Walker, 1863; Tortrix sanbornana Robinson, 1869; Tortrix seminolana Kearfott, 1907; Cacoecia transiturana Walker, 1863; Lozotaenia vesperana Clemens, 1865

= Choristoneura obsoletana =

Species of moth

Choristoneura obsoletana is a species of moth of the family Tortricidae. It is found in the United States, where it has been recorded from Alabama, Arkansas, California, Florida, Illinois, Kansas, Louisiana, Maine, Massachusetts, Mississippi, Missouri, New Mexico, North Carolina, Ohio, Oklahoma, Oregon, South Carolina, Tennessee, Virginia and West Virginia.

The wingspan is 21–24 mm. Adults have been recorded on wing from April to December.

The larvae feed on Asimina (including Asimina triloba), Gaylussacia, Senna, Fragaria, Rubus and Typha species, as well as Betula papyrifera, Chamaedaphne calyculata, Lespedeza cuneata and Aronia melanocarpa.
