= Choristoneura metasequoiacola =

Scientific classification
- Domain: Eukaryota
- Kingdom: Animalia
- Phylum: Arthropoda
- Class: Insecta
- Order: Lepidoptera
- Family: Tortricidae
- Genus: Choristoneura
- Species: C. metasequoiacola

Binomial name
- Choristoneura metasequoiacola Liu, 1983

Species of moth

Choristoneura metasequoiacola is a species of moth of the family Tortricidae. It is found in Hubei, China.

The wingspan is 16 mm for males and 18 mm for females. Adults have been recorded on wing from July and August.

The larvae feed on Metasequoia glyptostroboides.
