= Choristoneura chapana =

Scientific classification
- Kingdom: Animalia
- Phylum: Arthropoda
- Class: Insecta
- Order: Lepidoptera
- Family: Tortricidae
- Genus: Choristoneura
- Species: C. chapana

Binomial name
- Choristoneura chapana Razowski, 2008

Species of moth

Choristoneura chapana is a species of moth of the family Tortricidae. It is found in Vietnam.

The wingspan is about 22 mm.
