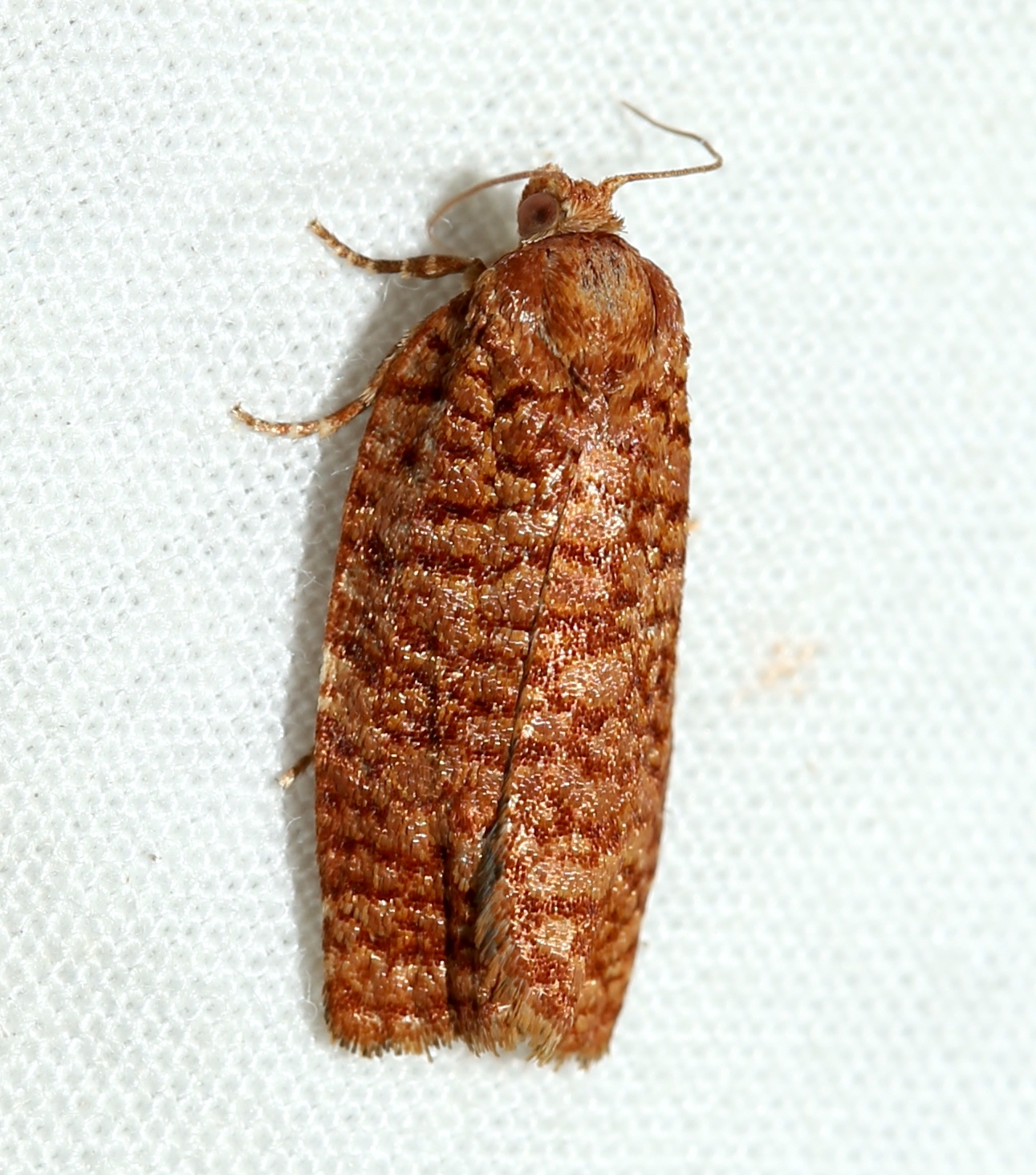

Scientific classification
- Kingdom: Animalia
- Phylum: Arthropoda
- Class: Insecta
- Order: Lepidoptera
- Family: Tortricidae
- Genus: Choristoneura
- Species: C. pinus

Binomial name
- Choristoneura pinus Freeman, 1953

= Choristoneura pinus =

Jack pine budworm

Species of moth

Choristoneura pinus, the jack pine budworm, is a moth of the family Tortricidae. The species was first described by Thomas Nesbitt Freeman in 1953. It is found in jack pine forests in Canada from Atlantic provinces to Cypress Hills on the Alberta-Saskatchewan border as well as northern United States from New England to the lake states.

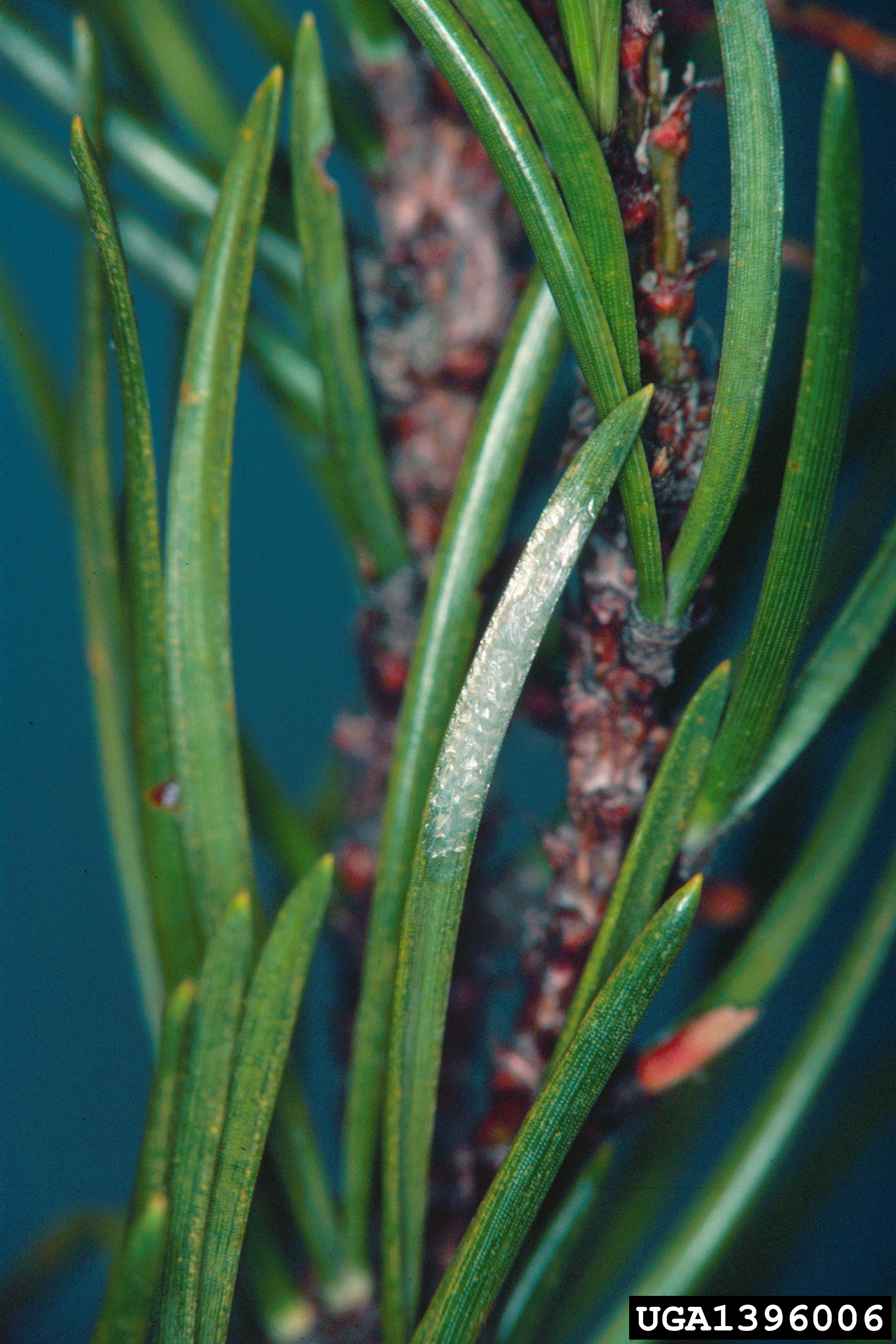
Eggs

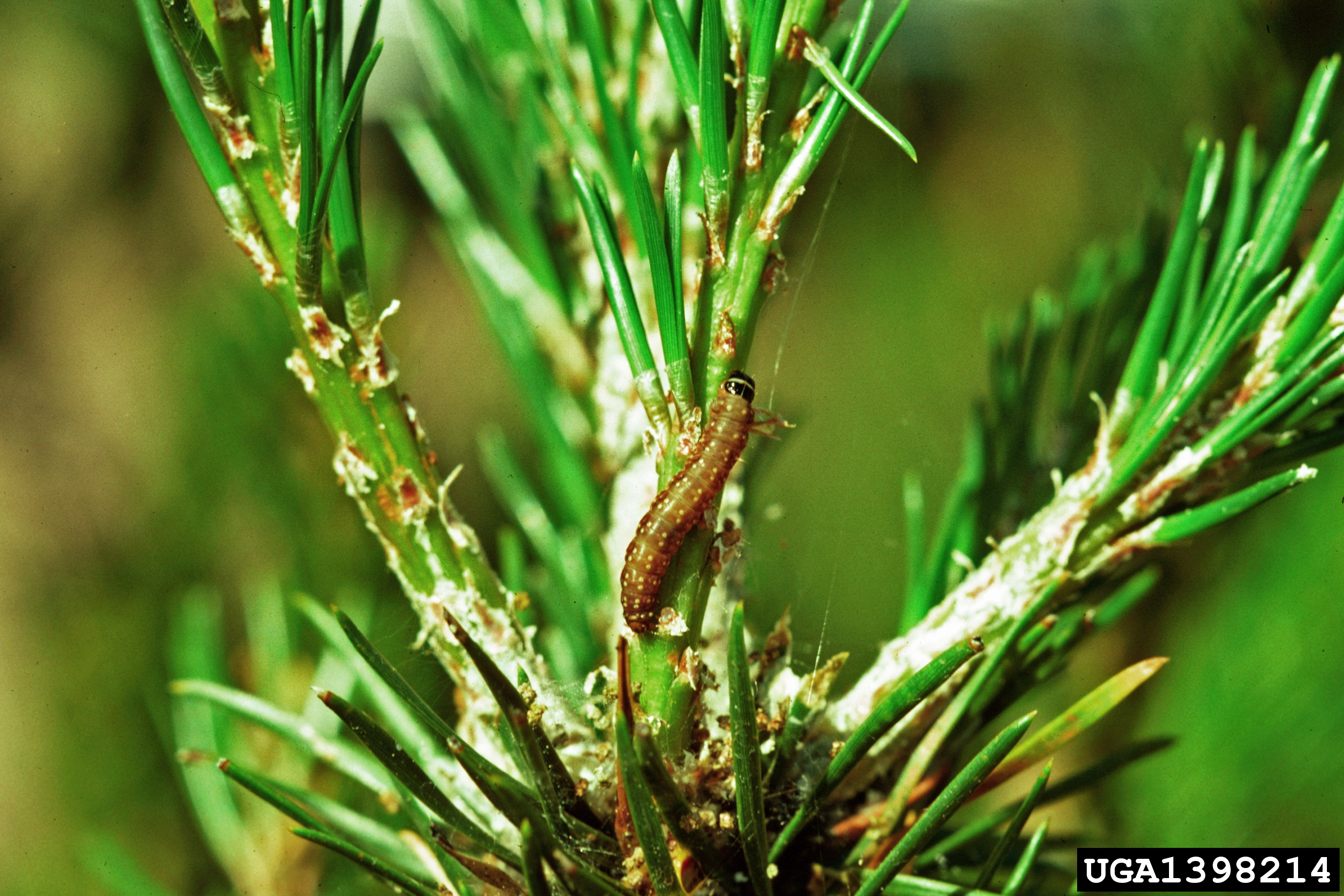
Caterpillar

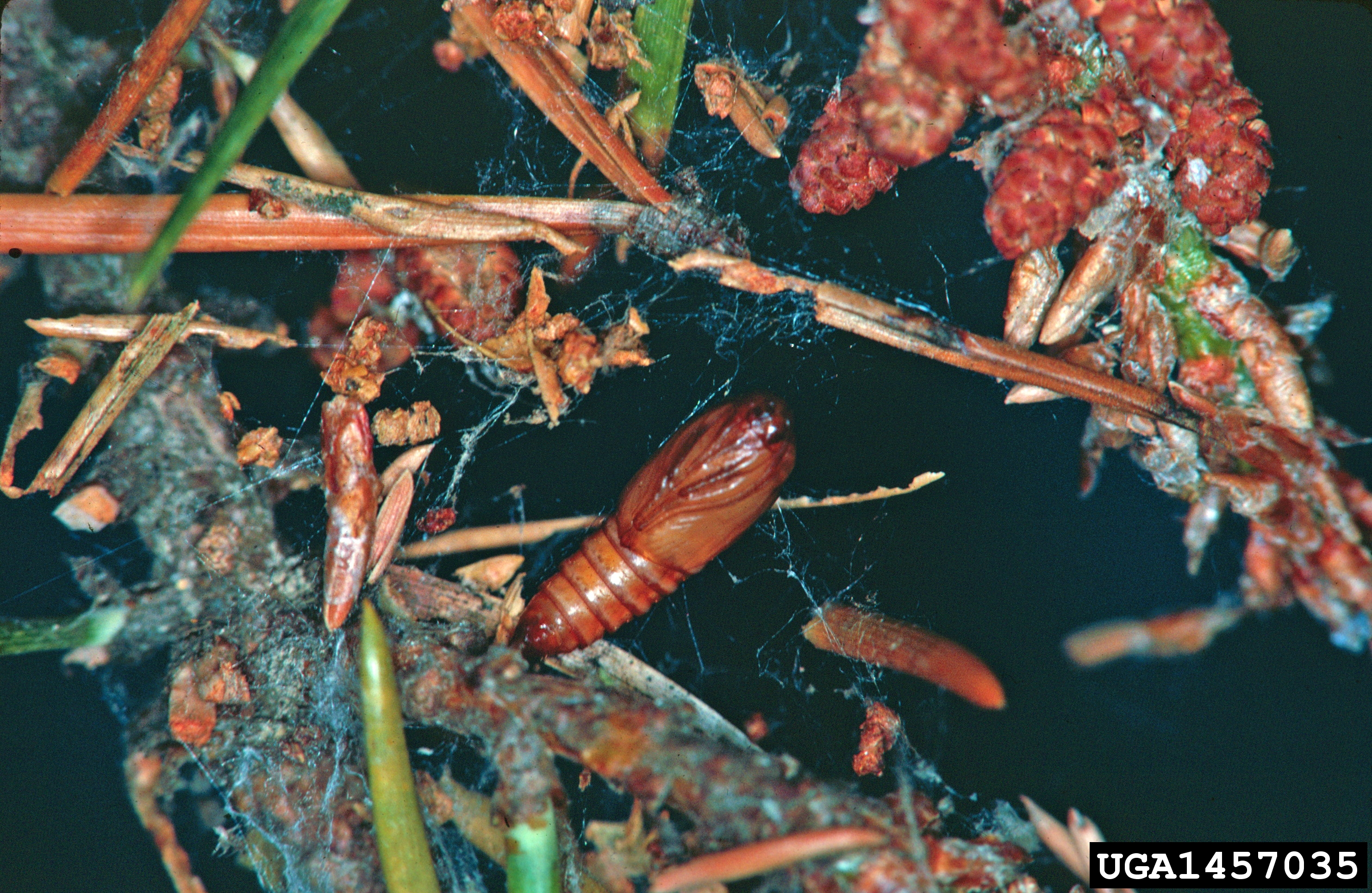
Pupa

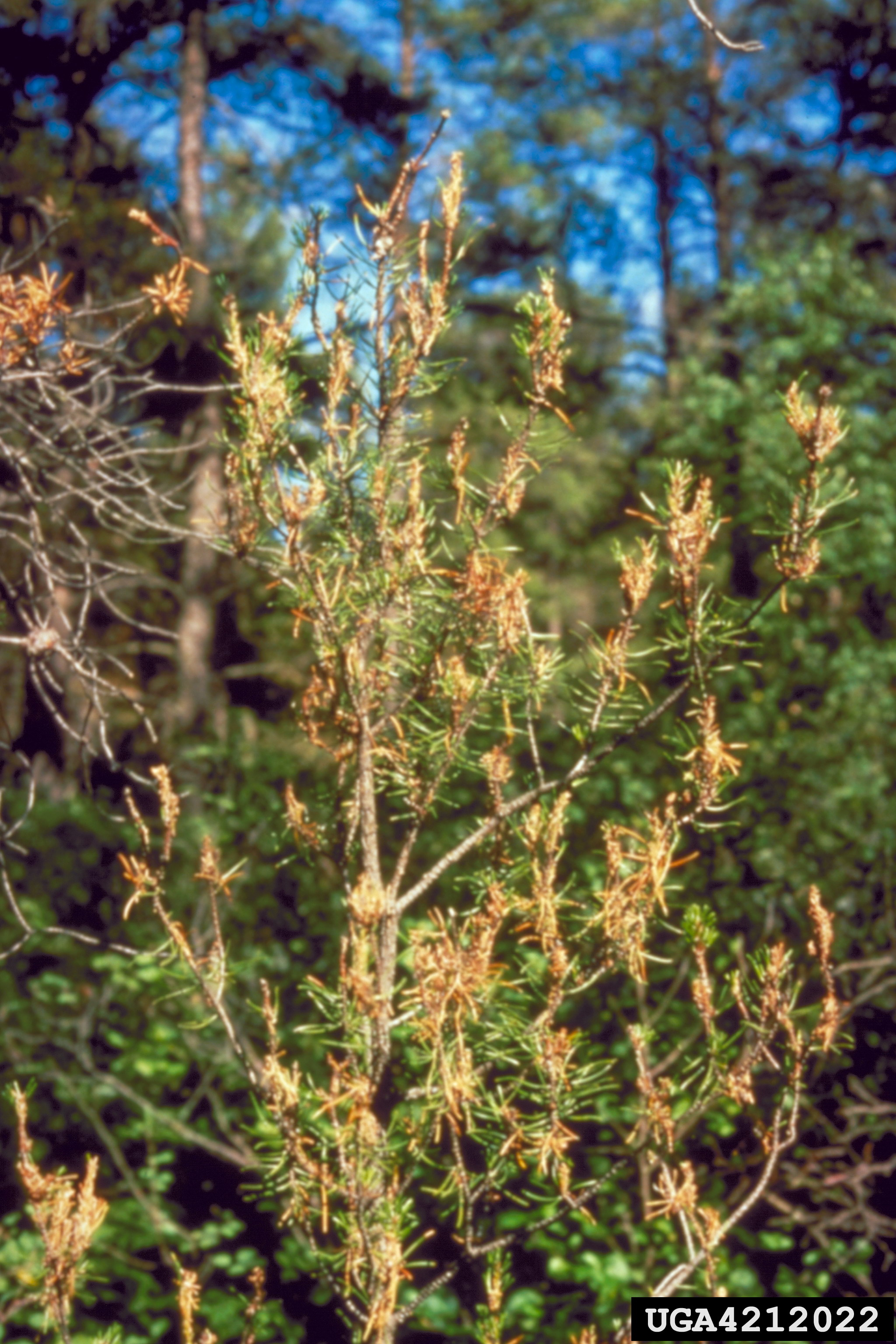
Damage

The wingspan is 18–24 mm for males and 15–28 mm for females. Adults are on wing from June to August.

The larvae feed on Pinus banksiana.

== Subspecies ==
- Choristoneura pinus pinus
- Choristoneura pinus maritima Freeman, 1967 (Pennsylvania)
