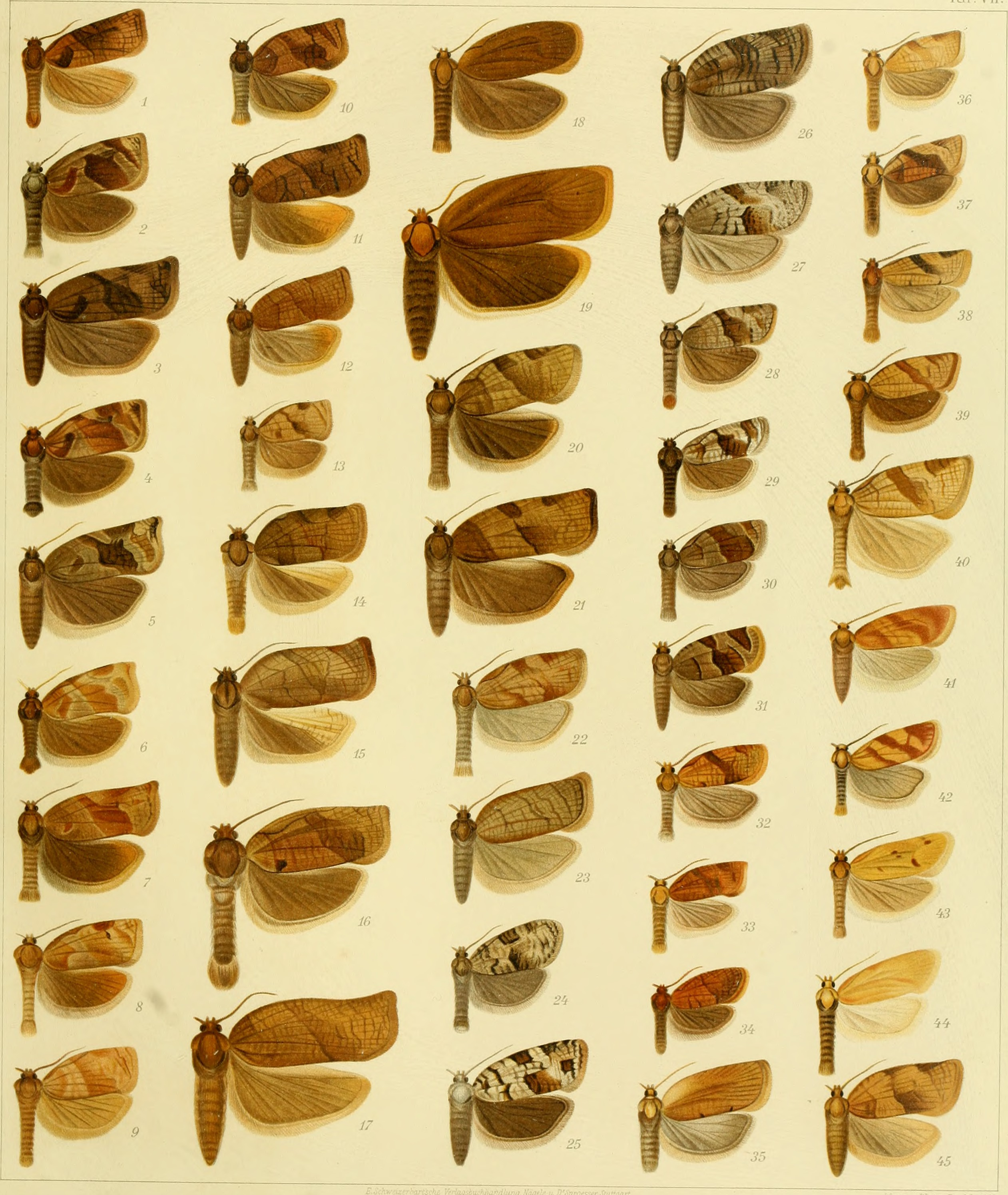
- Choristoneura luticostana in Kennel Die palaearktischen tortriciden figures 18 male gigantea Kenn (Askold), 19 female (Sutschan)

Scientific classification
- Domain: Eukaryota
- Kingdom: Animalia
- Phylum: Arthropoda
- Class: Insecta
- Order: Lepidoptera
- Family: Tortricidae
- Genus: Choristoneura
- Species: C. luticostana

Binomial name
- Choristoneura luticostana (Christoph, 1888)

Synonyms
- Tortrix luticostana Christoph, 1888; Tortrix gigantana Kennel, 1899

= Choristoneura luticostana =

Species of moth

Choristoneura luticostana is a species of moth of the family Tortricidae. It is found in China (Heilongjiang, Jilin), the Korean Peninsula, the Russian Far East and Japan. The habitat consists of fir-broad-leaved and cedar-broad-leaved forests.

Adults have been recorded on wing from June to August.

The larvae feed on Quercus, Betula, Lespedeza and Rhododendron species, as well as Malus pumila. Larvae can be found from May to June.
