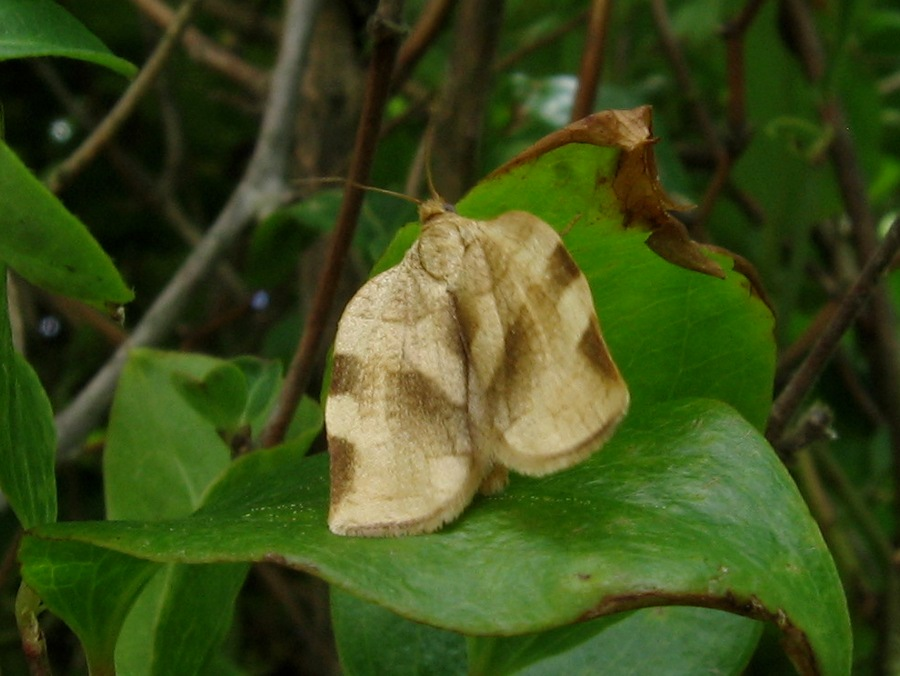

Scientific classification
- Kingdom: Animalia
- Phylum: Arthropoda
- Clade: Pancrustacea
- Class: Insecta
- Order: Lepidoptera
- Family: Tortricidae
- Genus: Choristoneura
- Species: C. fractivittana

Binomial name
- Choristoneura fractivittana (Clemens, 1865)

Synonyms
- Lozotaenia fractivittana Clemens, 1865; Tortrix fumosa Robinson, 1869

= Choristoneura fractivittana =

Species of moth

Choristoneura fractivittana, the broken-banded leafroller or dark-banded fireworm, is a moth of the family Tortricidae.

== Distribution ==
This moth is native to North America, where it can be found across Canada and throughout the eastern United States.

== Description ==
The wingspan is 16–28 mm.

== Biology ==
The larva feeds on Malus, Fagus, Betula, Ulmus, Quercus and Rubus species.

There is one generation per year in the north and two in the south. The adult flies in May and June in the north and from May to August in the south.

== Etymology ==
The species name is derived from Latin frangere ("to break") and vitta ("a band" or "a stripe of color") and refers to the broken or separated brown band on the forewing.
