= Choristoneura neurophaea =

Scientific classification
- Kingdom: Animalia
- Phylum: Arthropoda
- Class: Insecta
- Order: Lepidoptera
- Family: Tortricidae
- Genus: Choristoneura
- Species: C. neurophaea

Binomial name
- Choristoneura neurophaea (Meyrick, 1932)

Synonyms
- Tortrix neurophaea Meyrick, 1932

Species of moth

Choristoneura neurophaea is a species of moth of the family Tortricidae. It is found in Kashmir.
