= Choristoneura griseicoma =

Scientific classification
- Kingdom: Animalia
- Phylum: Arthropoda
- Class: Insecta
- Order: Lepidoptera
- Family: Tortricidae
- Genus: Choristoneura
- Species: C. griseicoma

Binomial name
- Choristoneura griseicoma (Meyrick, 1924)

Synonyms
- Tortrix griseicoma Meyrick, 1924

Species of moth

Choristoneura griseicoma is a species of moth of the family Tortricidae. It is found in Kashmir.
