= Choristoneura adumbratanus =

Scientific classification
- Domain: Eukaryota
- Kingdom: Animalia
- Phylum: Arthropoda
- Class: Insecta
- Order: Lepidoptera
- Family: Tortricidae
- Genus: Choristoneura
- Species: C. adumbratanus

Binomial name
- Choristoneura adumbratanus (Walsingham, 1900)

Synonyms
- Archips adumbratanus Walsingham, 1900; Choristoneura adumbratana; Cacoecia teshionis Matsumura, 1931

Species of moth

Choristoneura adumbratanus is a species of moth of the family Tortricidae. It is found in Japan, Korea and China (Heilongjiang, Jilin).

The wingspan is 22–26 mm for males and 27–37 mm for females. Adults are on wing from June to August.

The larvae feed on Quercus species (including Quercus acutissima, Quercus cerris), Malus baccata, Malus pumila, Prunus x yedoensis and Salix species.
