= Choristoneura spaldingana =

Scientific classification
- Domain: Eukaryota
- Kingdom: Animalia
- Phylum: Arthropoda
- Class: Insecta
- Order: Lepidoptera
- Family: Tortricidae
- Genus: Choristoneura
- Species: C. spaldingana

Binomial name
- Choristoneura spaldingana Obraztsov, 1962

Species of moth

Choristoneura spaldingana is a species of moth of the family Tortricidae. It is found in the United States, where it has been recorded from California and Utah.
