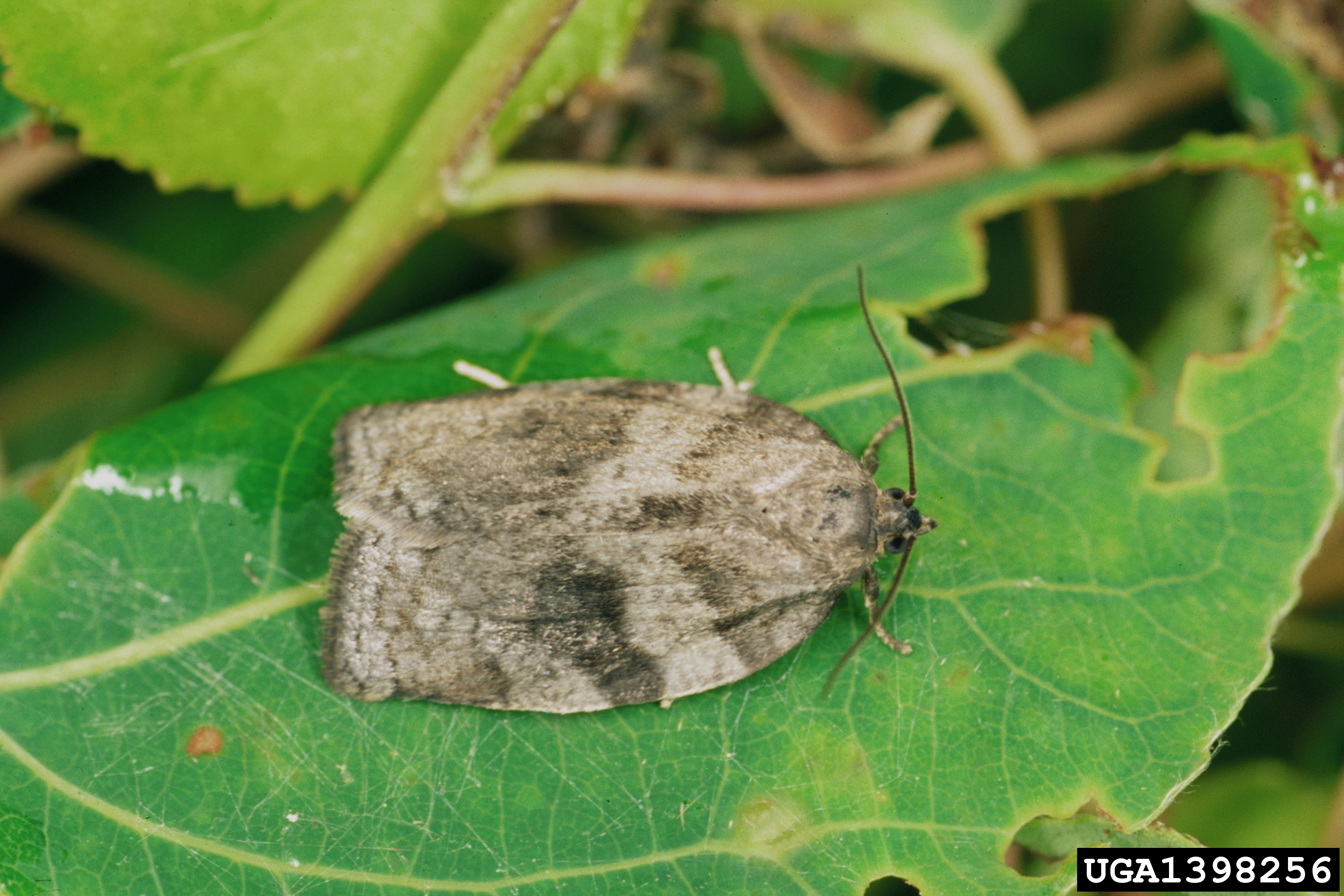

Scientific classification
- Kingdom: Animalia
- Phylum: Arthropoda
- Class: Insecta
- Order: Lepidoptera
- Family: Tortricidae
- Genus: Choristoneura
- Species: C. conflictana

Binomial name
- Choristoneura conflictana (Walker, 1863)

Synonyms
- Tortrix conflictana Walker, 1863

= Choristoneura conflictana =

Species of moth

Choristoneura conflictana, the large aspen tortrix, is a moth of the family Tortricidae. The species was first described by Francis Walker in 1863. It is found from the Pacific to the Atlantic coast and from Alaska to California, Arizona, and New Mexico.

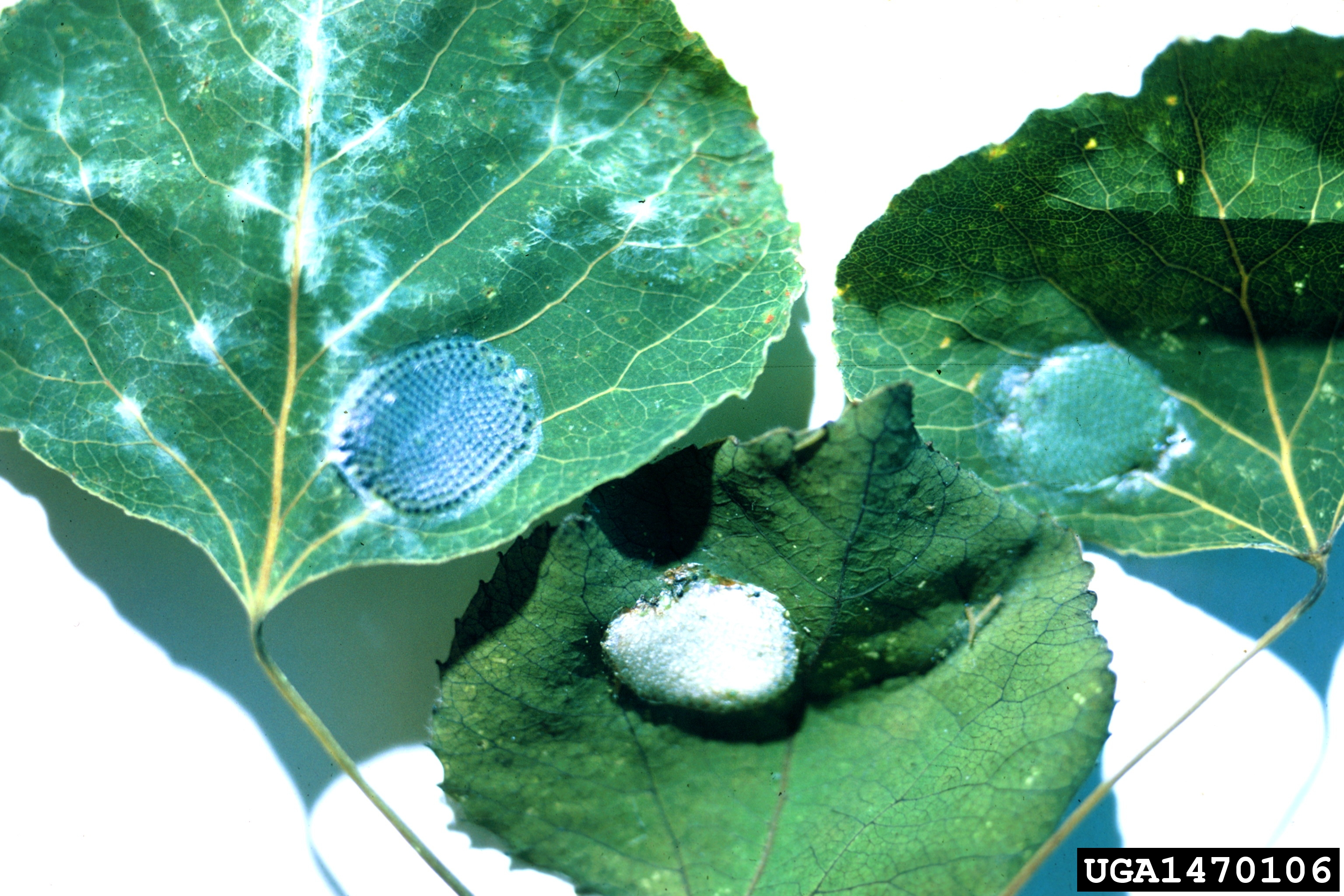
Eggs

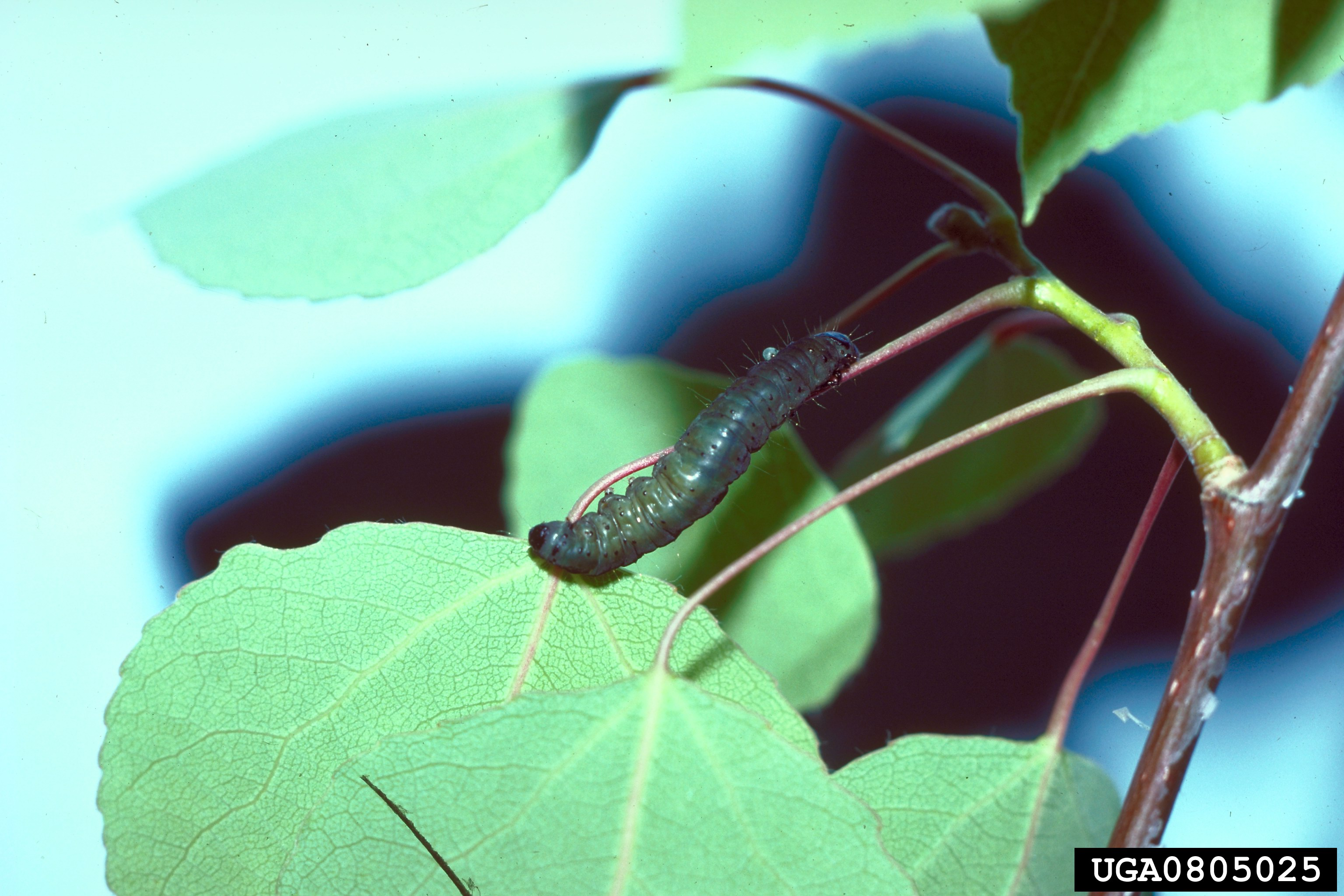
Caterpillar

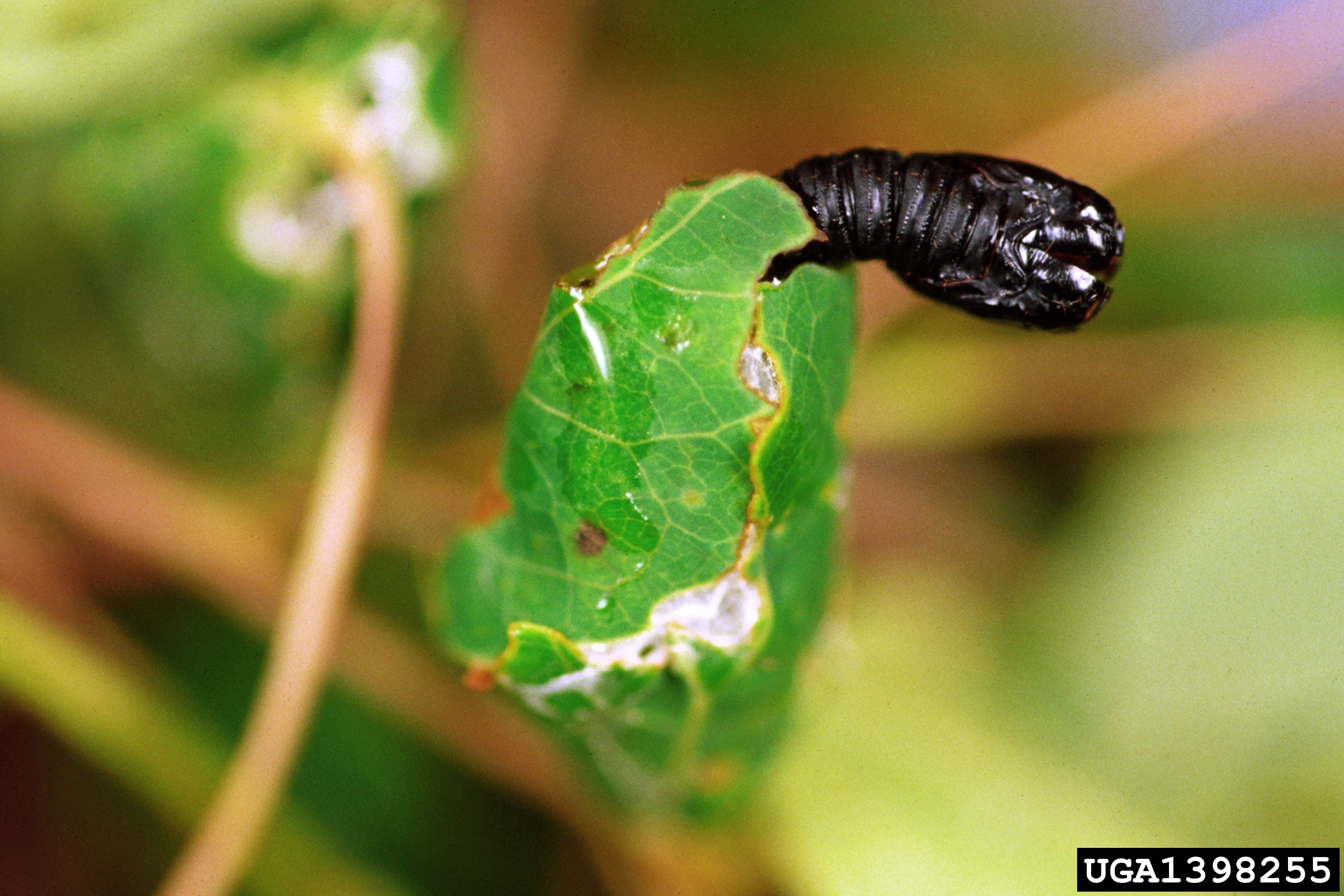
Pupa

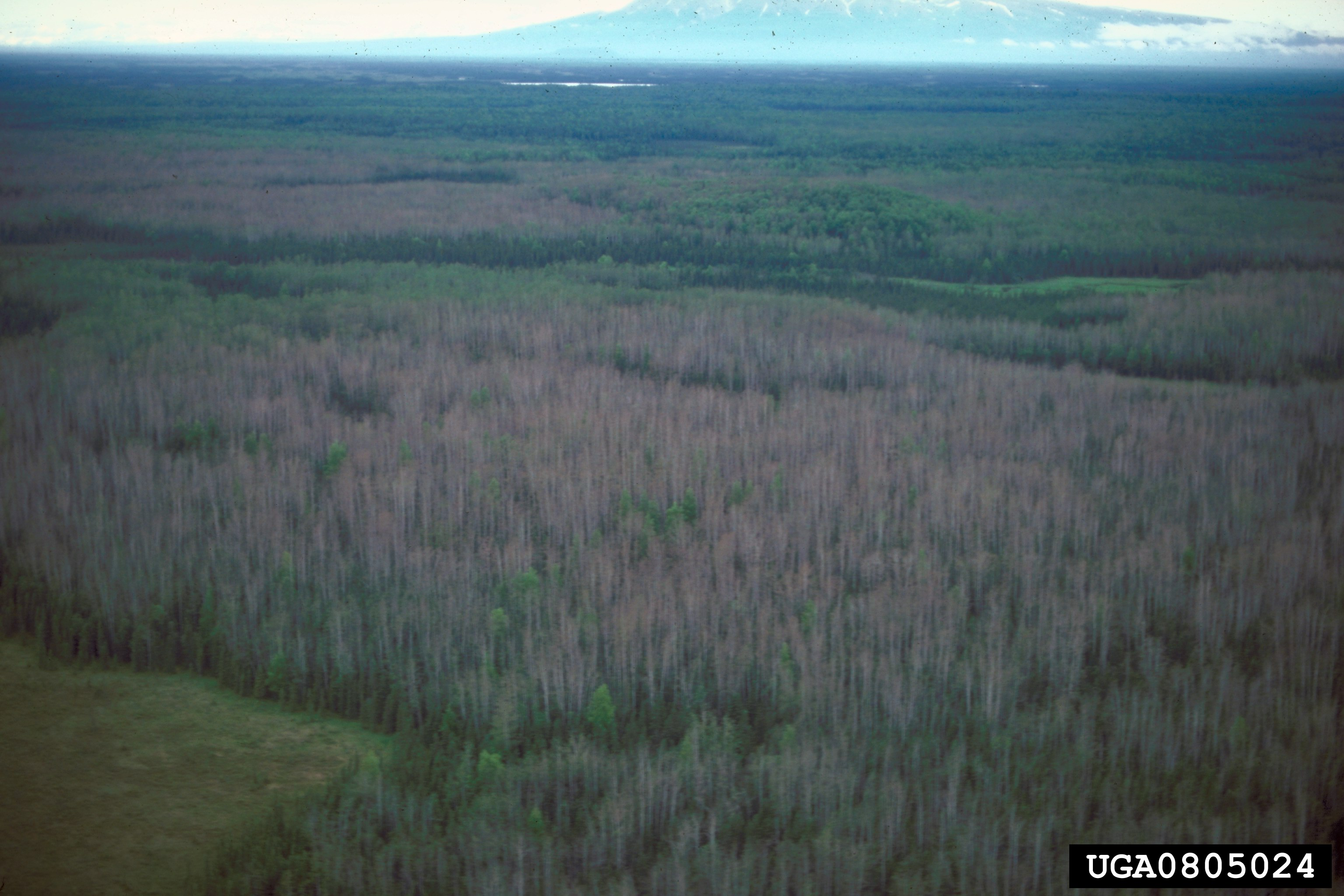
Damage

The wingspan is 25–35 mm. Adults are on wing from May to August.

The larvae feed on Populus tremuloides.
