= Choristoneura africana =

Scientific classification
- Kingdom: Animalia
- Phylum: Arthropoda
- Class: Insecta
- Order: Lepidoptera
- Family: Tortricidae
- Genus: Choristoneura
- Species: C. africana

Binomial name
- Choristoneura africana Razowski, 2002

Synonyms
- Procrita africana

Species of moth

Choristoneura africana is a species of moth of the family Tortricidae. It is found in Cameroon.

The wingspan is 13–15 mm.
