= Choristoneura bracatana =

Scientific classification
- Domain: Eukaryota
- Kingdom: Animalia
- Phylum: Arthropoda
- Class: Insecta
- Order: Lepidoptera
- Family: Tortricidae
- Genus: Choristoneura
- Species: C. bracatana

Binomial name
- Choristoneura bracatana (Rebel, in Rebel & Rogenhofer, 1894)

Synonyms
- Pandemis bracatana Rebel, in Rebel & Rogenhofer, 1894; Tortrix bracatana

Species of moth

Choristoneura bracatana is a species of moth of the family Tortricidae. It is found on the Canary Islands.

The wingspan is 28–32 mm.

The larvae feed on Viburnum rugosum.
