= Choristoneura retiniana =

Scientific classification
- Domain: Eukaryota
- Kingdom: Animalia
- Phylum: Arthropoda
- Class: Insecta
- Order: Lepidoptera
- Family: Tortricidae
- Genus: Choristoneura
- Species: C. retiniana

Binomial name
- Choristoneura retiniana (Walsingham, 1879)

Synonyms
- Lozotaenia retiniana Walsingham, 1879; Choristoneura lambertiana lindseyana Obraztsov, 1962; Choristoneura viridis Freeman, 1967

Species of moth

Choristoneura retiniana is a species of moth of the family Tortricidae. It is found in the United States, where it has been recorded from California and Nevada.

The wingspan is 20–25 mm. Adults have been recorded on wing from June to September.

The larvae feed on Abies concolor, Abies magnifica, Abies grandis and Pseudotsuga menziesii.
