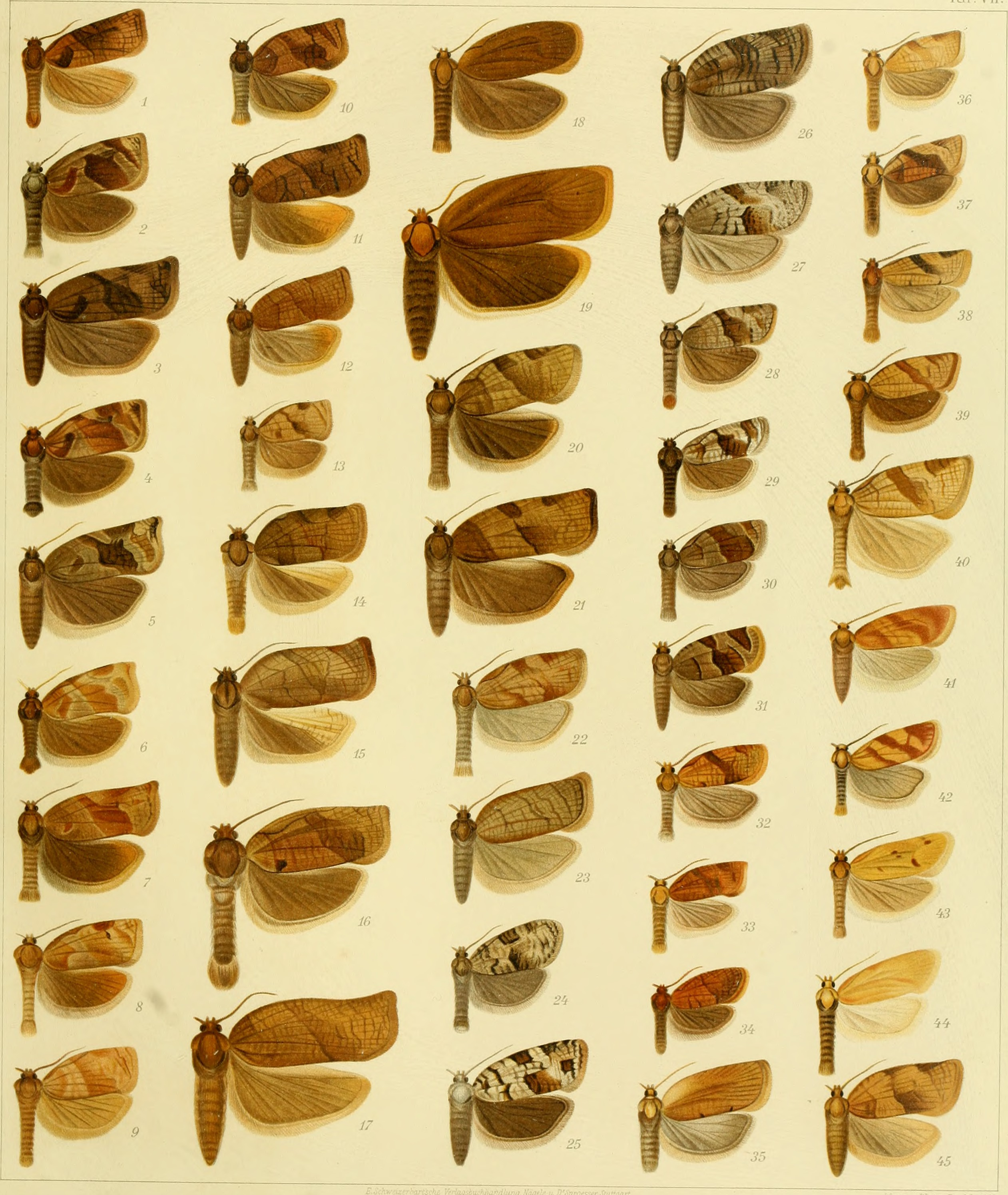
- Choristoneura evanidana in Kennel Die palaearktischen tortriciden figures 14 (Askold), 15 Cacoecia evanidana female (Askold)

Scientific classification
- Domain: Eukaryota
- Kingdom: Animalia
- Phylum: Arthropoda
- Class: Insecta
- Order: Lepidoptera
- Family: Tortricidae
- Genus: Choristoneura
- Species: C. evanidana

Binomial name
- Choristoneura evanidana (Kennel, 1901)

Synonyms
- Cacoecia evanidana Kennel, 1901; Choristoneura evanida

= Choristoneura evanidana =

Species of moth

Choristoneura evanidana is a species of moth of the family Tortricidae. It is found in the Russian Far East, Korea and China (Heilongjiang, Liaoning).

The wingspan is 21–23 mm for males and 24–28 mm for females. Adults are on wing from July to August.

The larvae feed on Maackia amurensis, Quercus mongolica, Malus baccata, Prunus x yedoensis, Acer tegmentosum, Aralia elata, Betula platyphylla, Betula davurica, Corylus heterophylla, Corylus sieboldiana var. mandshurica, Rhododendron mucronulatum, Flueggea suffruticosa, Lespedeza bicolor, Philadelphus schrenkii, Philadelphus tenuifolius, Deutzia hamata, Syringa reticulata, Abies holophylla, Chaenomeles speciosa, Spiraea betulifolia, Phellodendron amurense, Schisandra chinensis, Tilia amurensis and Prunus manschurica. They live in rolled clumps or leaf tubes.
