= Choristoneura palladinoi =

Scientific classification
- Kingdom: Animalia
- Phylum: Arthropoda
- Class: Insecta
- Order: Lepidoptera
- Family: Tortricidae
- Genus: Choristoneura
- Species: C. palladinoi

Binomial name
- Choristoneura palladinoi Razowski & Trematerra, 2010

Species of moth

Choristoneura palladinoi is a species of moth of the family Tortricidae. The species is endemic to Ethiopia, where it is known only from the Harenna Forest in the Bale Mountains. The wingspan is about 15 mm. The head and thorax are rust brown. The forewings are pale reddish-brown with dark rust-brown markings. The hindwings are brownish.

== Taxonomy ==
Choristoneura palladinoi was described by the entomologists J. Razowski and P. Trematerra in 2010 on the basis of an adult male specimen collected from the Bale Mountains in Ethiopia. The species is named after Alenuccio Palladino, who collected the holotype of this species and several other Ethiopian moths.

The species resembles C. dinota in external morphology.

== Description ==
The wingspan is about 15 mm. The head and thorax are rust brown. The forewings do not widen at the tips; the leading edge (costa) is clearly curved at the base, while the outer edge (termen) is mostly straight up to the middle and not very slanted. The forewings are pale reddish-brown, with dark rust-brown markings that include a blotch near the base, a central band (median fascia), and a small spot near the tip (subapical blotch). The cilia is the same color as the wing. The hindwings are brownish, with lighter-colored cilia.

In the male genitalia, the uncus is narrow up to the middle, then widens and becomes rounded at the end. The socius is poorly defined. The gnathos has a broad arm and a long, slender, curved terminal plate. The valva is oval-shaped. The sacculus is narrow, featuring a thorn on the upper side near the middle and a small free end. The transtilla is broad and curves inward at the center. The aedeagus is small and slender, with a proportionally long coecum penis. Two thorn-like projections emerge from this region.

The appearance of the female is unknown.

== Distribution ==
The species is endemic to Ethiopia, where it is known only from the Harenna Forest in the Bale Mountains.
