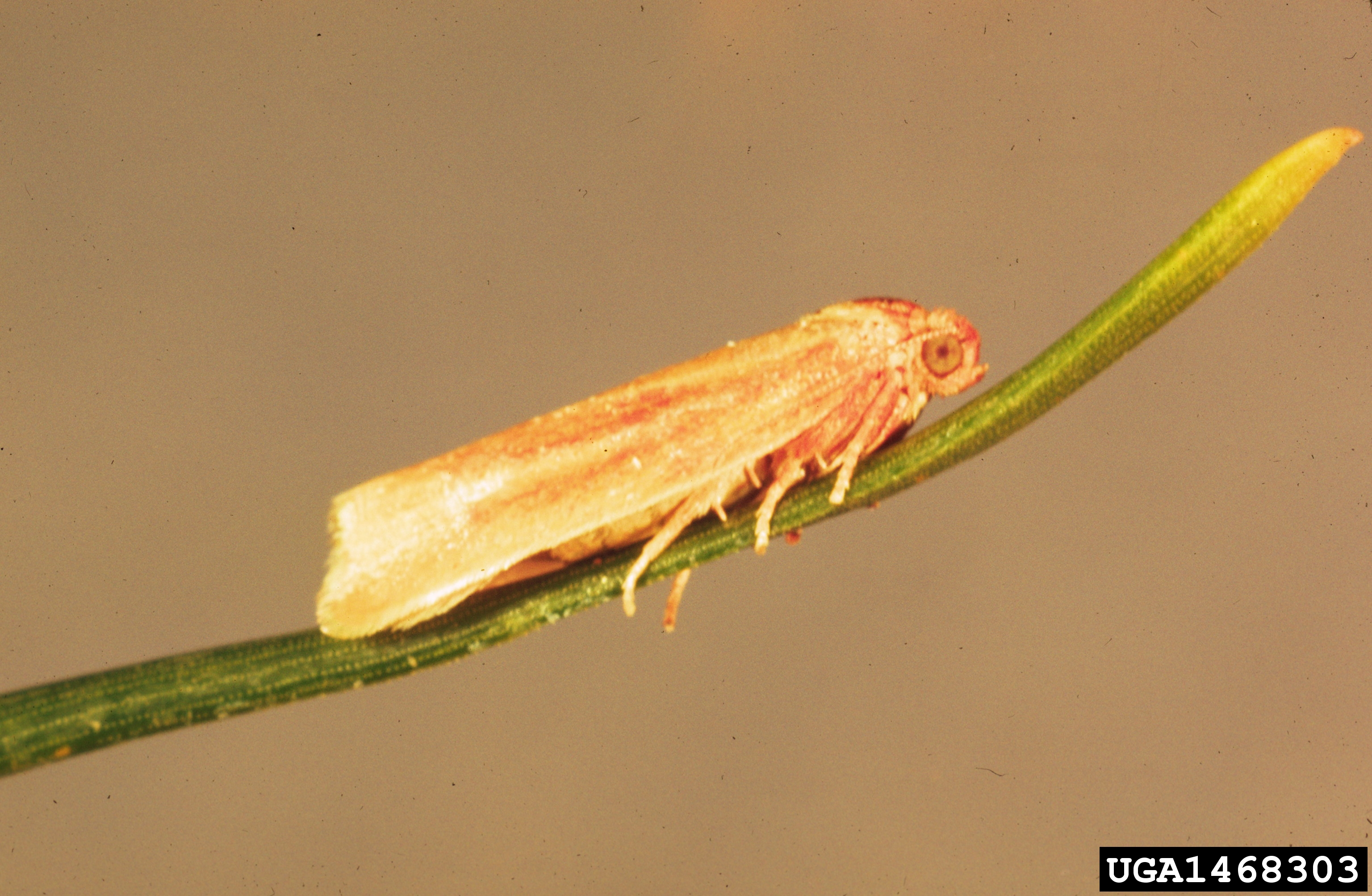

Scientific classification
- Domain: Eukaryota
- Kingdom: Animalia
- Phylum: Arthropoda
- Class: Insecta
- Order: Lepidoptera
- Family: Tortricidae
- Genus: Choristoneura
- Species: C. lambertiana

Binomial name
- Choristoneura lambertiana (Busck, 1915)

Synonyms
- Tortrix lambertiana Busck, 1915; Tortrix lambertianae Keen, 1952

= Choristoneura lambertiana =

Sugar pine tortrix

Species of moth

Choristoneura lambertiana, the sugar pine tortrix, is a moth of the family Tortricidae. It is found in the eastern parts of North America and the northern regions of the United States (see subspecies section for more information).

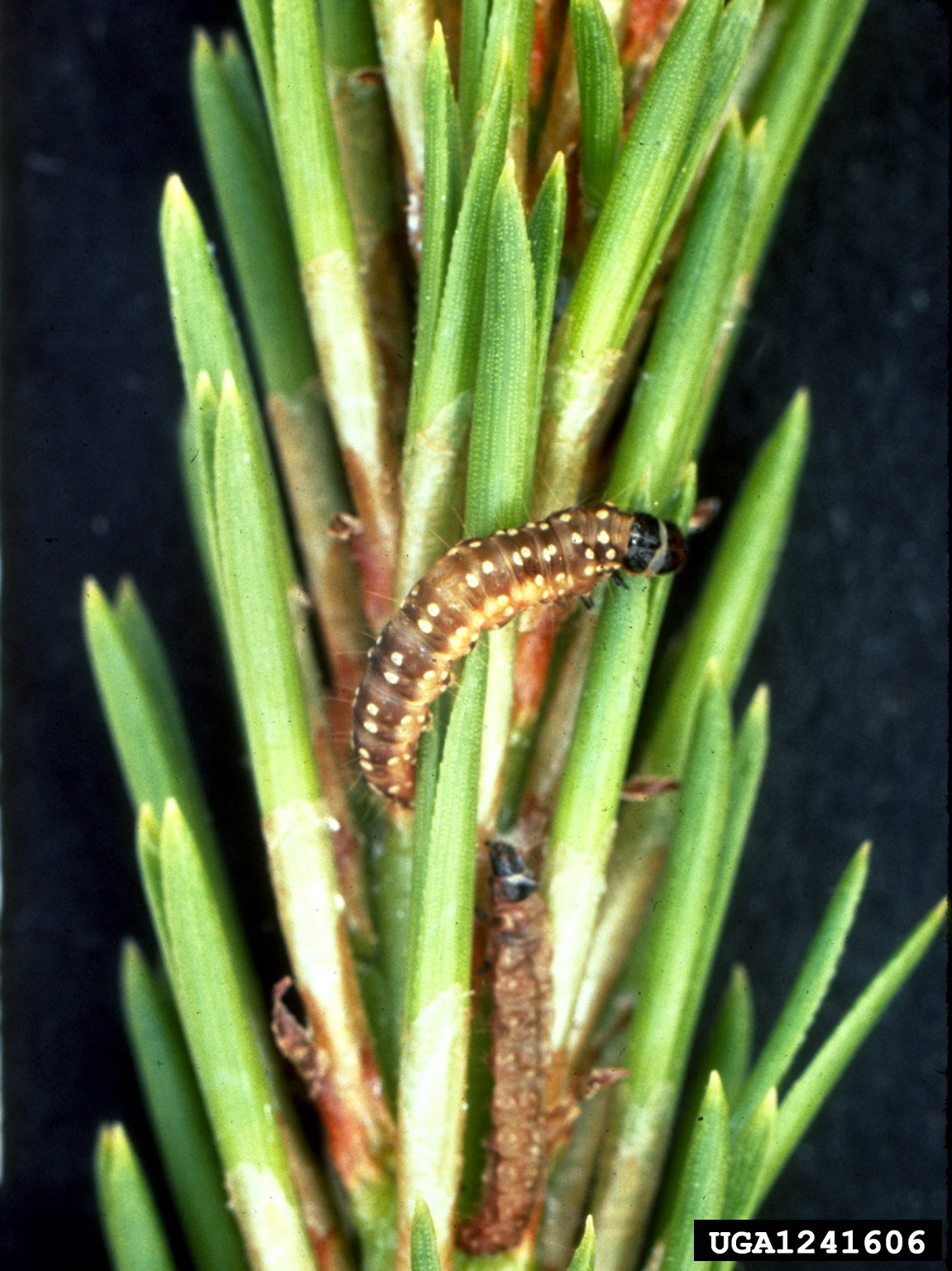
Caterpillar

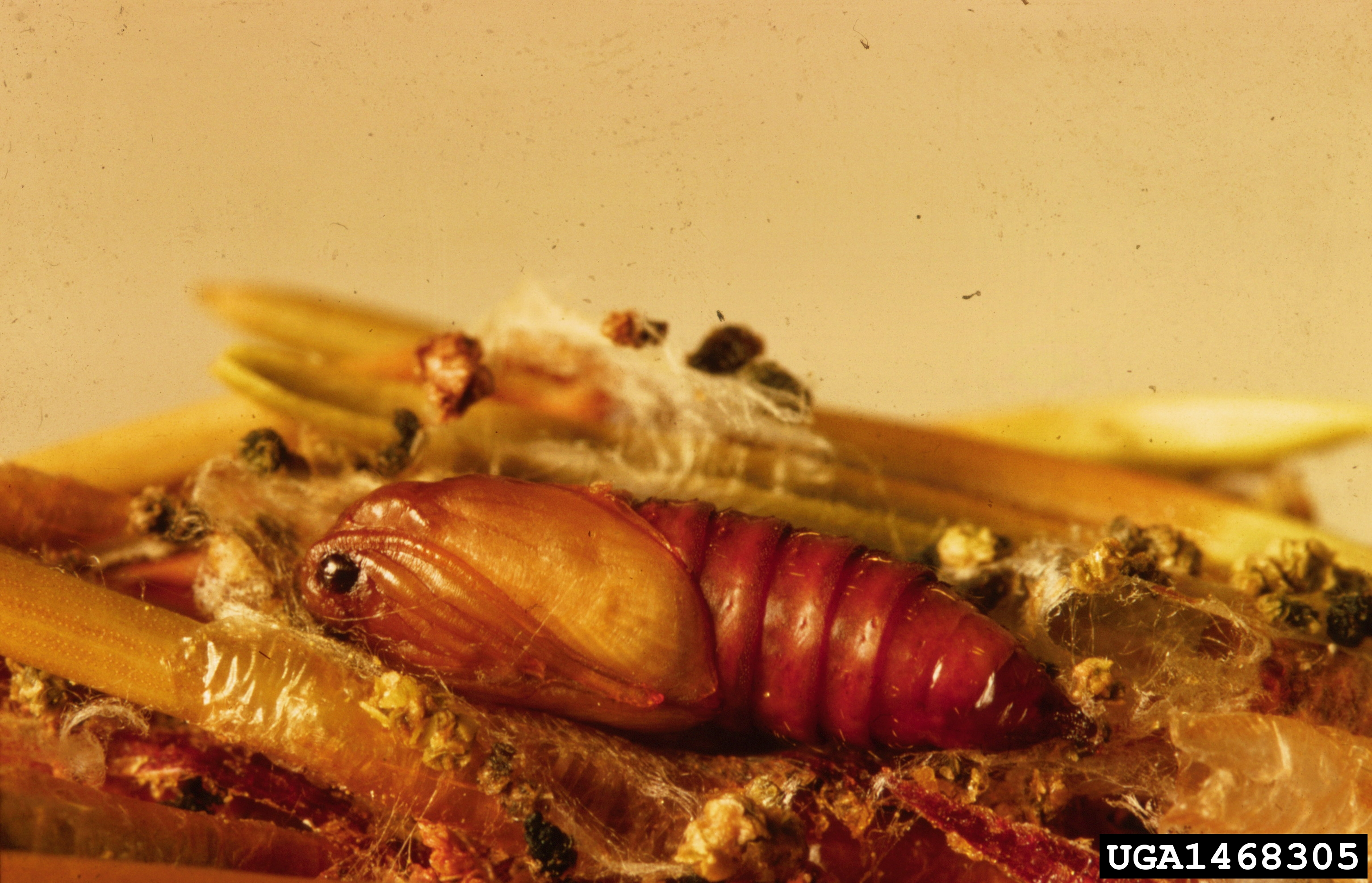
Pupa

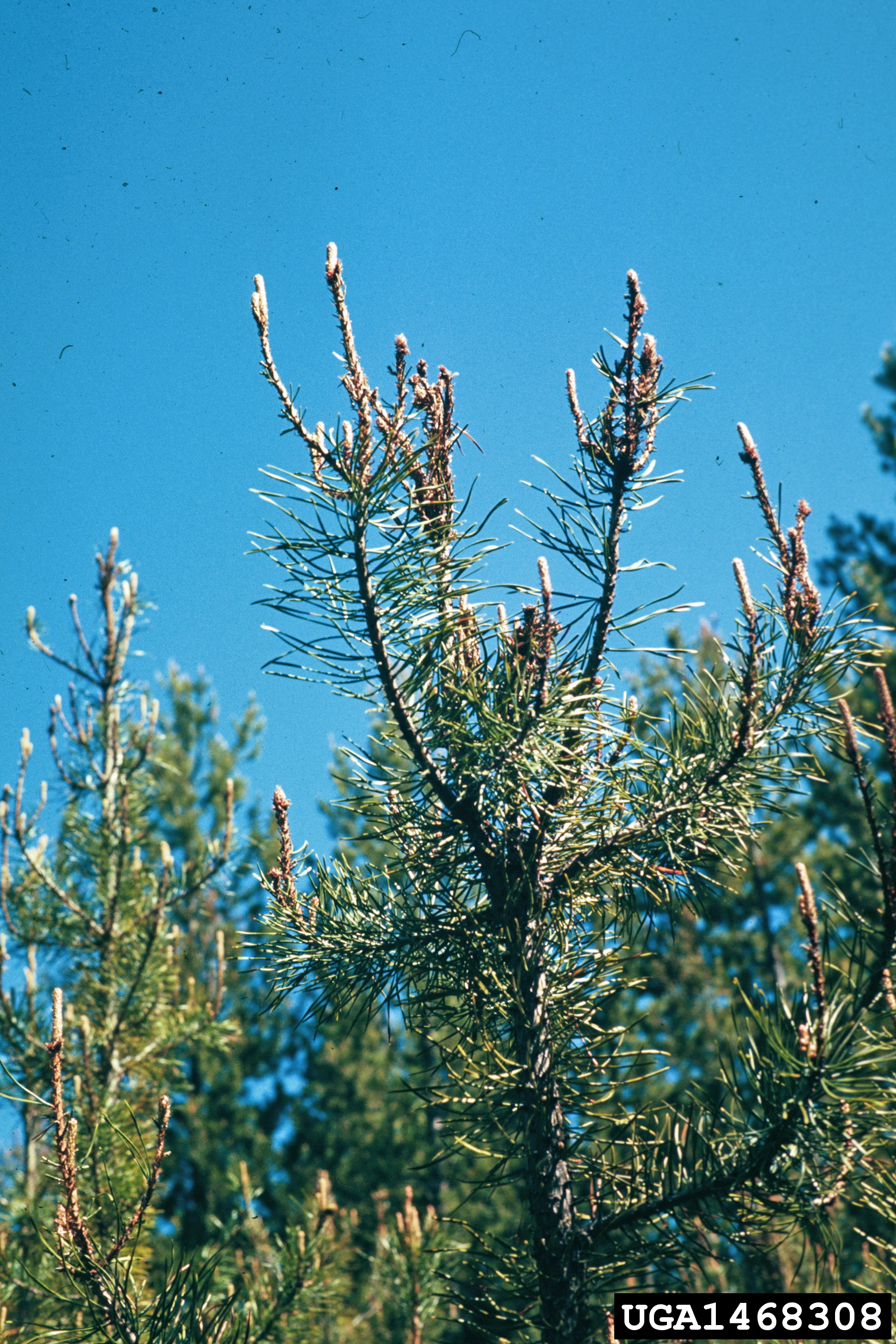
Damage

The wingspan is 18–23 mm.

The larvae of Choristoneura lambertiana lambertiana feed on Pinus lambertiana. Subspecies Choristoneura lambertiana ponderosana prefers Pinus ponderosa and Pinus flexilis. Subspecies Choristoneura lambertiana subretiniana feeds on Pinus contorta and Pinus jeffreyi.

== Subspecies ==
- Choristoneura lambertiana lambertiana (confirmed: Siskiyou County and Ashland, Oregon. Uncertain: Alberta and British Columbia in Canada and Idaho, Montana, eastern Oregon and Wyoming in the United States)
- Choristoneura lambertiana ponderosana Obraztsov, 1962 (Arizona, Colorado, Nevada, New Mexico, western New England, South Dakota)
- Choristoneura lambertiana subretiniana Obraztsov, 1962 (California and Oregon)
