= Choristoneura improvisana =

Scientific classification
- Domain: Eukaryota
- Kingdom: Animalia
- Phylum: Arthropoda
- Class: Insecta
- Order: Lepidoptera
- Family: Tortricidae
- Genus: Choristoneura
- Species: C. improvisana

Binomial name
- Choristoneura improvisana (Kuznetsov, 1973)

Synonyms
- Argyrotaenia improvisana Kuznetsov, 1973

Species of moth

Choristoneura improvisana is a species of moth of the family Tortricidae. It is found in Primorsky Krai in the Russian Far East.

The wingspan is 14–15 mm.
