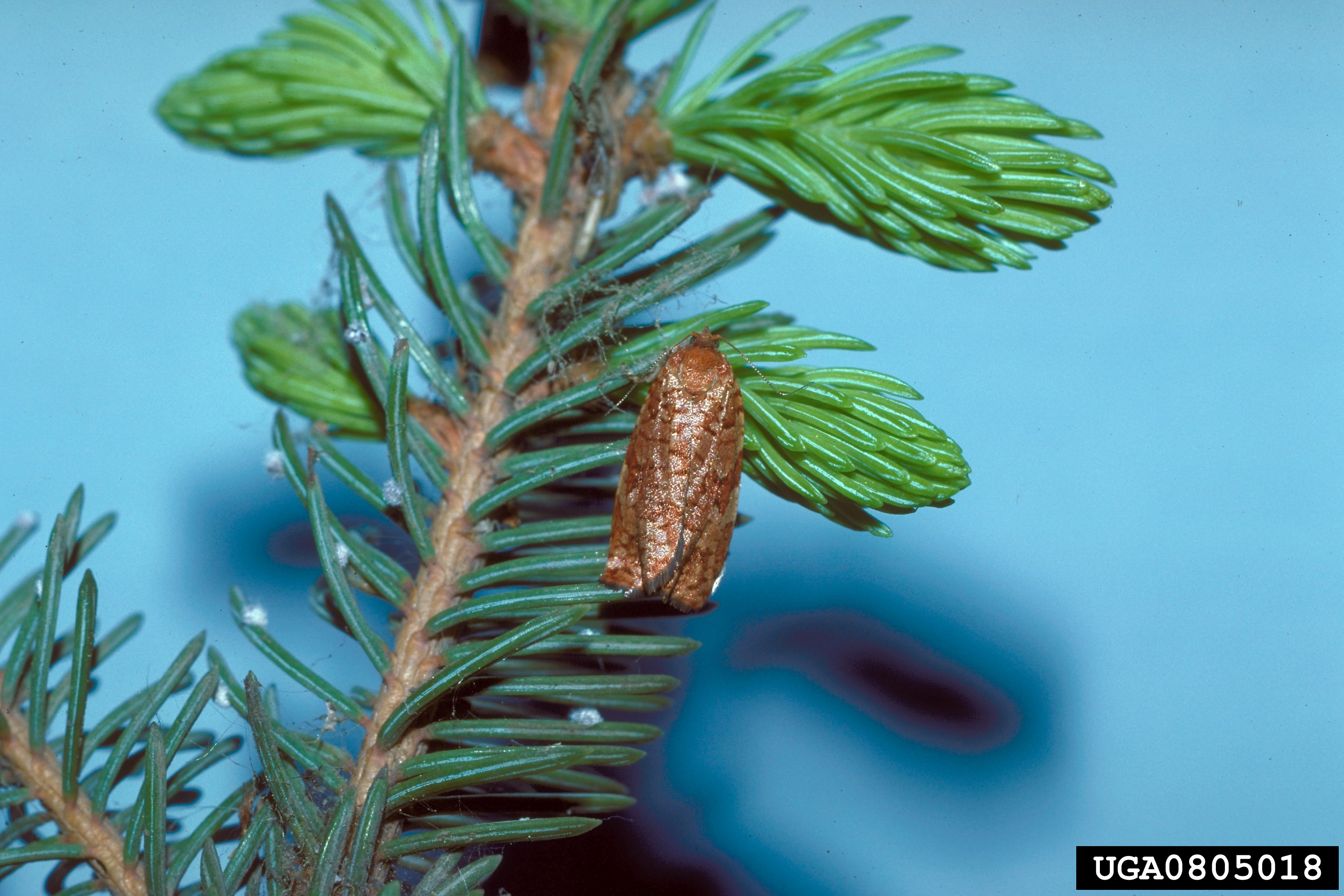

Scientific classification
- Domain: Eukaryota
- Kingdom: Animalia
- Phylum: Arthropoda
- Class: Insecta
- Order: Lepidoptera
- Family: Tortricidae
- Genus: Choristoneura
- Species: C. orae

Binomial name
- Choristoneura orae Freeman, 1967

= Choristoneura orae =

Species of moth

Choristoneura orae, the spruce budworm, is a moth of the family Tortricidae. It is found in North America.

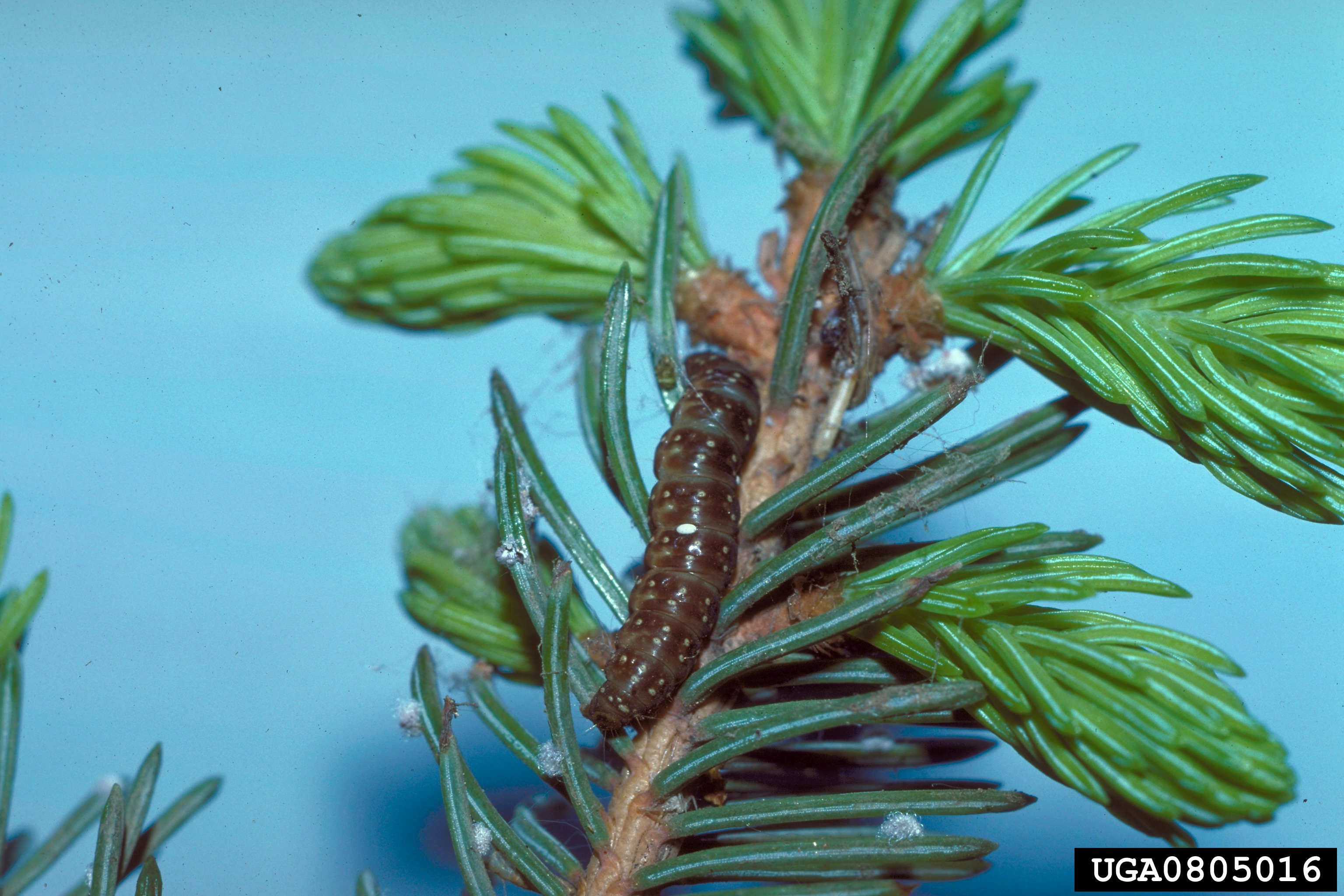
Caterpillar

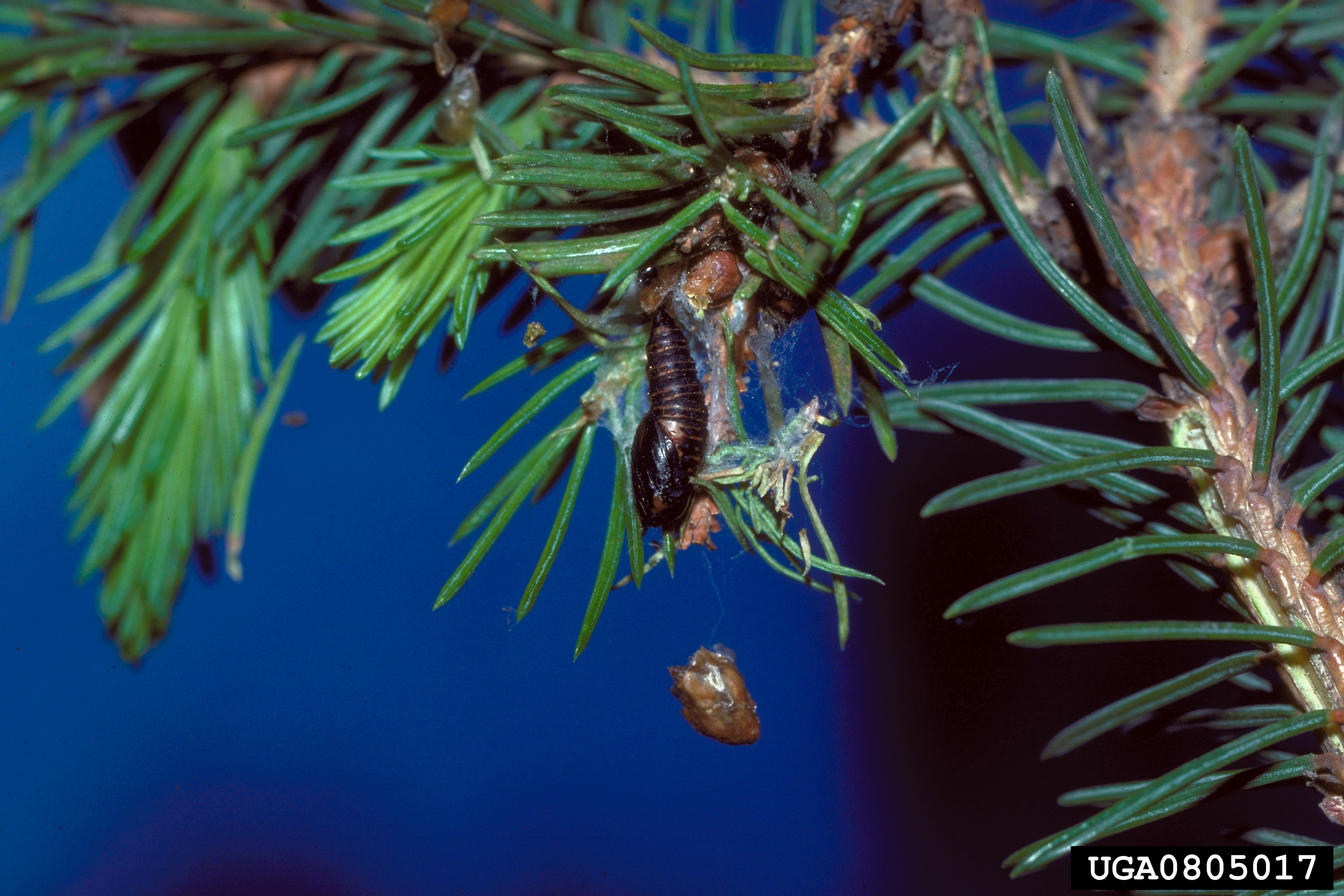
Pupa

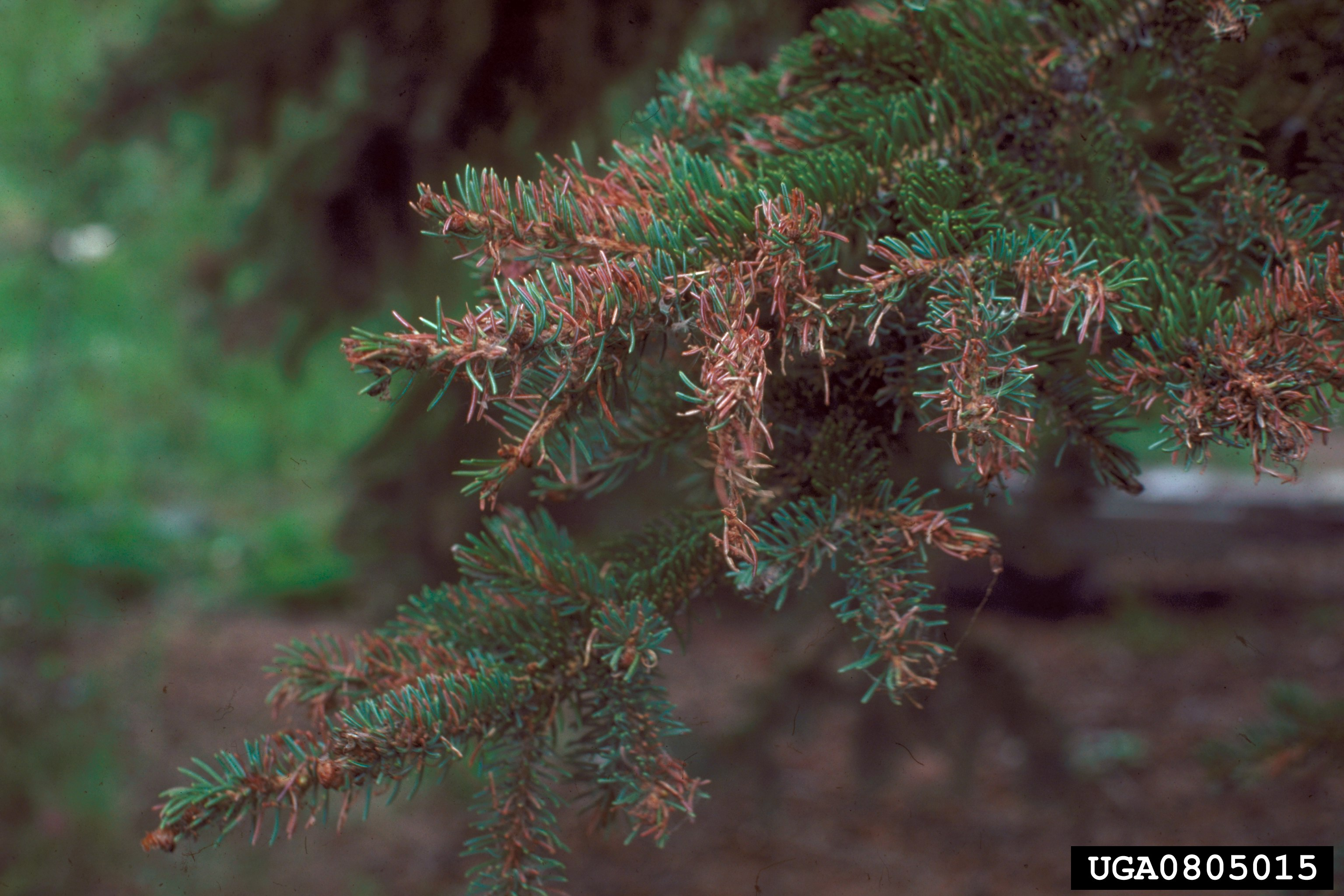
Damage

The wingspan is about 24 mm.

The larvae feed on Picea species.
