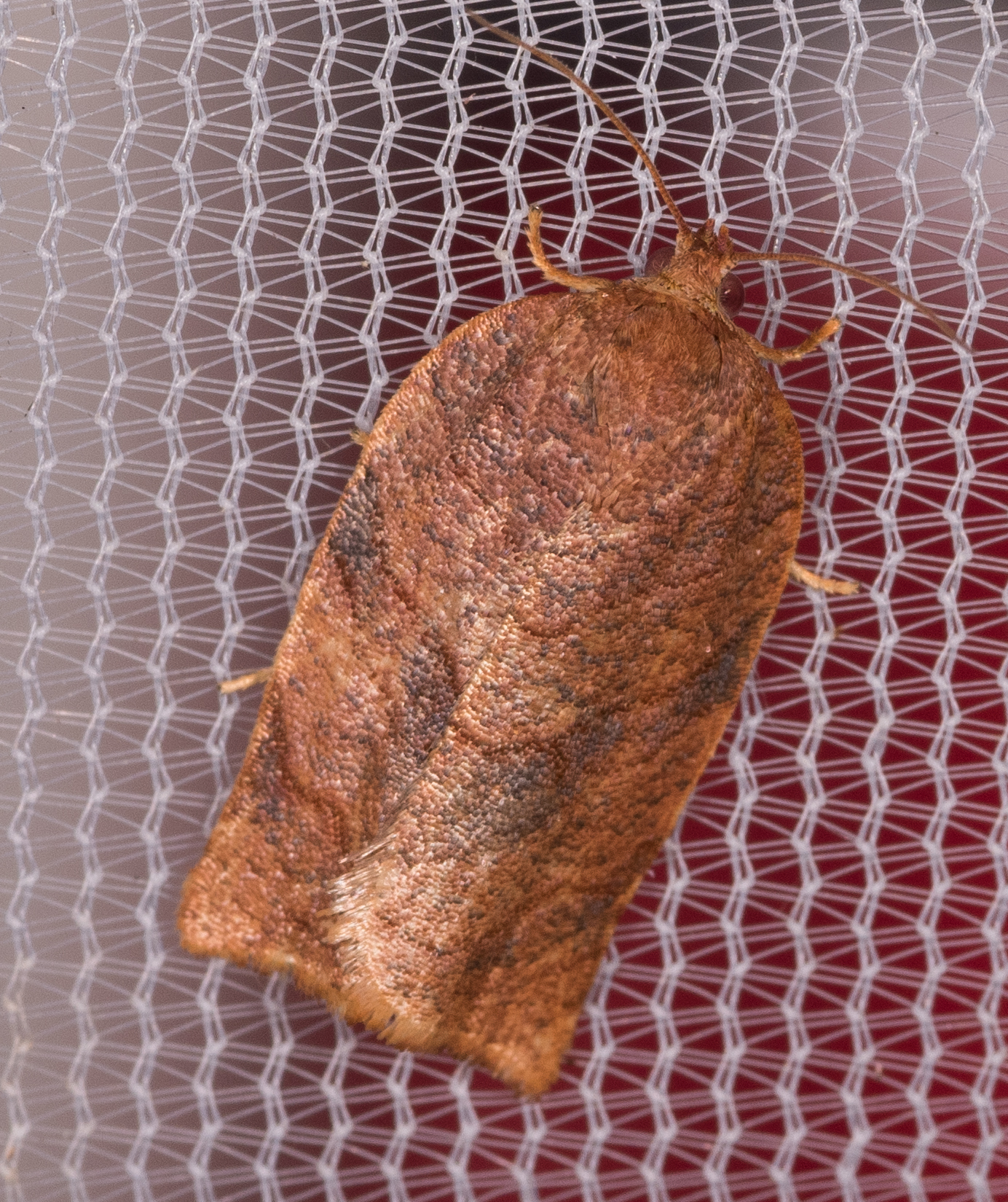

Scientific classification
- Kingdom: Animalia
- Phylum: Arthropoda
- Clade: Pancrustacea
- Class: Insecta
- Order: Lepidoptera
- Family: Tortricidae
- Genus: Choristoneura
- Species: C. parallela

Binomial name
- Choristoneura parallela (Robinson, 1869)

Synonyms
- Tortrix parallela Robinson, 1869

= Choristoneura parallela =

Species of moth

Choristoneura parallela, the parallel-banded leafroller moth, is a species of moth of the family Tortricidae. It is found in North America, where it has been recorded from California, Florida, Georgia, Indiana, Kentucky, Maine, Maryland, Michigan, Mississippi, New Jersey, North Carolina, Ohio, Oklahoma, Quebec, Saskatchewan, South Carolina, Tennessee, Virginia and West Virginia.

The wingspan is 21–23 mm. Adults have been recorded on wing from March to October.

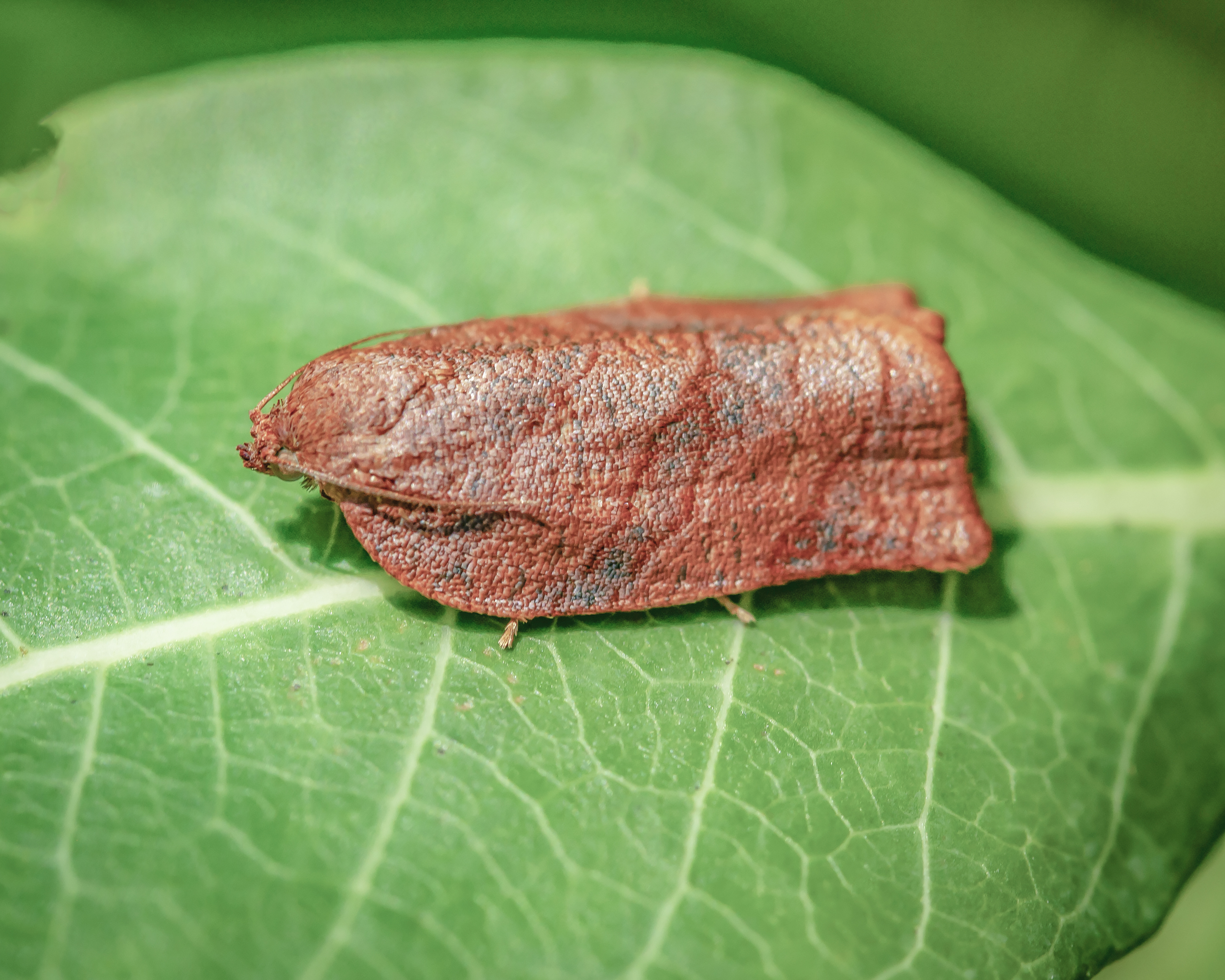
Parallel-banded Leafroller Moth (Choristoneura parallela) lateral view

The larvae feed on cranberries, Solidago, Kalmia, Vaccinium, Phaseolus, Myrica, Rosa, Gardenia, Citrus, Sarracenia and Smilax species, as well as Gerbera jamesonii, Hypericum perforatum, Chamaedaphne calyculata and Salix humilis var. tristis.
