= Choristoneura thyrsifera =

Scientific classification
- Kingdom: Animalia
- Phylum: Arthropoda
- Clade: Pancrustacea
- Class: Insecta
- Order: Lepidoptera
- Family: Tortricidae
- Genus: Choristoneura
- Species: C. thyrsifera

Binomial name
- Choristoneura thyrsifera Razowski, 1984

Species of moth

Choristoneura thyrsifera is a species of moth of the family Tortricidae. It is found in Yunnan, China.
