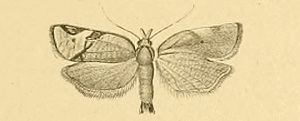

Scientific classification
- Kingdom: Animalia
- Phylum: Arthropoda
- Clade: Pancrustacea
- Class: Insecta
- Order: Lepidoptera
- Family: Tortricidae
- Genus: Choristoneura
- Species: C. simonyi

Binomial name
- Choristoneura simonyi (Rebel, 1892)

Synonyms
- Pandemis simonyi Rebel, 1892; Pandemis mactana Rebel, in Rebel & Rogenhofer, 1896; Pandemis persimilana Rebel, in Rebel & Rogenhofer, 1894

= Choristoneura simonyi =

Species of moth

Choristoneura simonyi is a species of moth of the family Tortricidae. It is found on the Canary Islands.

The wingspan is 16–19 mm.

The larvae feed on Adenocarpus and Globularia species, as well as on Nicotiana glauca.
