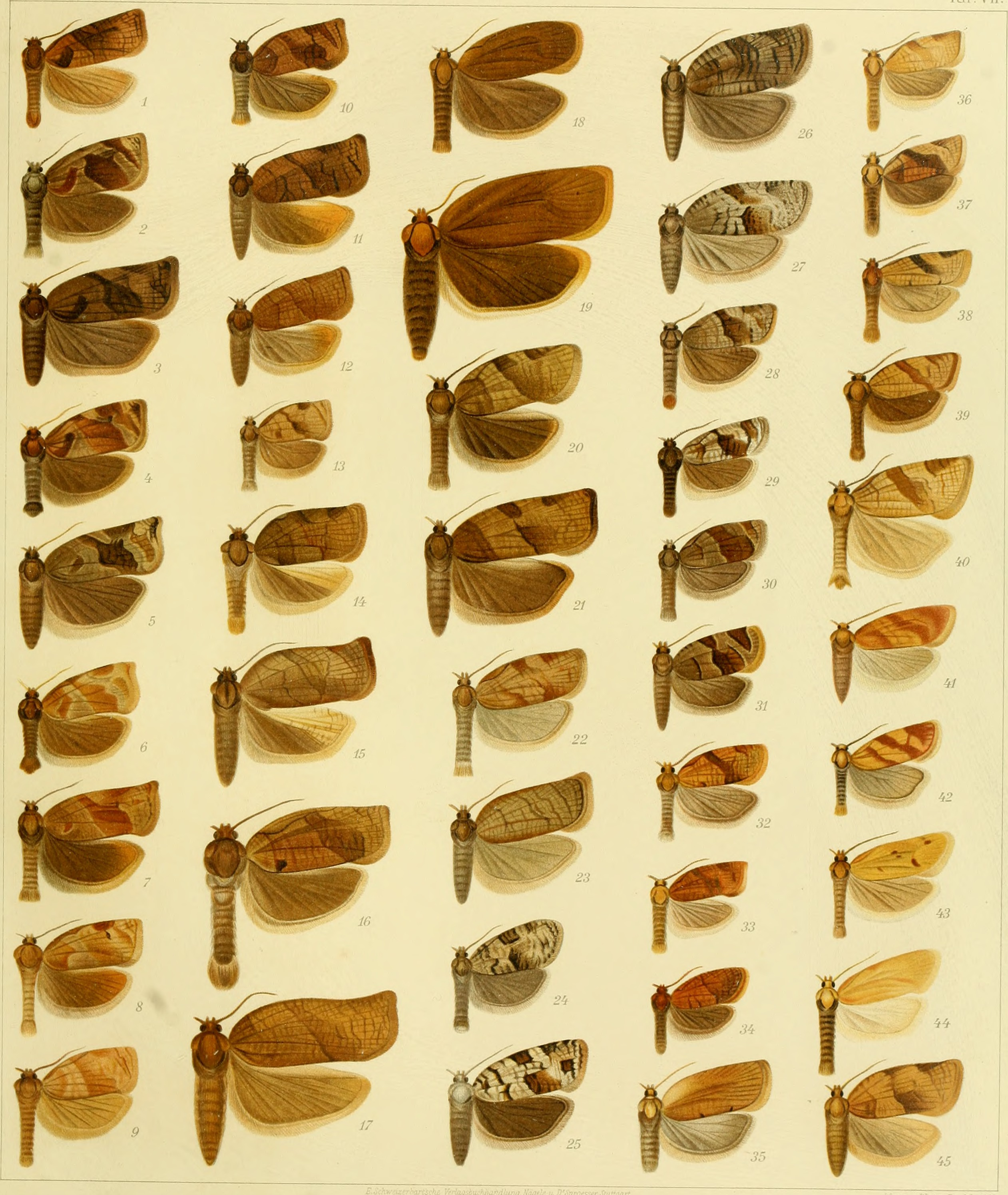
- Choristoneura longicellanus in Kennel Die palaearktischen tortriciden figures 16 male (Sutschan), 17 female (Chabarowka)

Scientific classification
- Domain: Eukaryota
- Kingdom: Animalia
- Phylum: Arthropoda
- Class: Insecta
- Order: Lepidoptera
- Family: Tortricidae
- Genus: Choristoneura
- Species: C. longicellanus

Binomial name
- Choristoneura longicellanus (Walsingham, 1900)

Synonyms
- Archips longicellanus Walsingham, 1900; Choristoneura longicellana; Hoshinoa longicellana; Cacoecia disparana Kennel, 1901

= Choristoneura longicellanus =

Species of moth

Choristoneura longicellanus is a species of moth of the family Tortricidae. It is found in China (Heilongjiang, Inner Mongolia, Shandong, Anhui, Hubei, Hunan, Jiangxi, Jiangsu, Sichuan, Yunnan), Japan, Taiwan, the Korean Peninsula and the Russian Far East.

The wingspan is 19–25 mm for males and 19–31 mm for females. Adults have been recorded on wing from July and August.

The larvae feed on Castanea (including Castanea crenata), Morus, Malus (including Malus pumila), Pyrus (including Pyrus ussuriensis, Pyrus pyrifolia) and Rosa species, as well as Fragaria × ananassa, Quercus acutissima, Quercus aliena, Quercus dentata, Quercus mongolica, Quercus serrata, Quercus variabilis, Ribes uva-crispa, Ligustrum obtusifolium, Prunus persica, Prunus salicina and Prunus × yedoensis. Larvae have been recorded from May to July.
