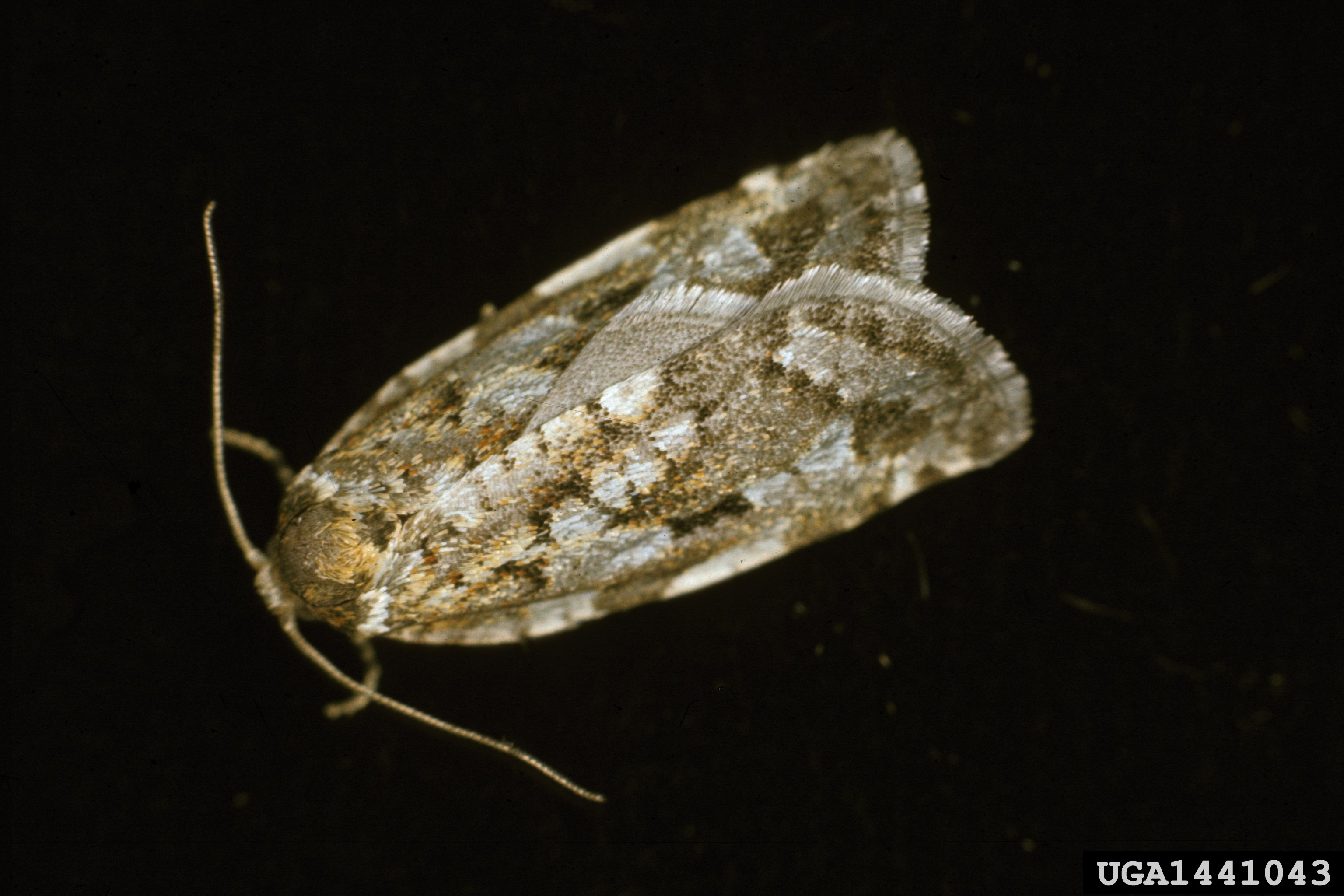
- Adult

Scientific classification
- Kingdom: Animalia
- Phylum: Arthropoda
- Class: Insecta
- Order: Lepidoptera
- Family: Tortricidae
- Genus: Choristoneura
- Species: C. freemani

Binomial name
- Choristoneura freemani Razowski, 2008

Synonyms
- Choristoneura occidentalis Freeman, 1967 (disputedly preocc. by Choristoneura occidentalis Walsingham, 1891)

= Choristoneura freemani =

Species of moth

Choristoneura occidentalis [or Choristoneura freemani in some schemes], the western spruce budworm, is a species of moth of the family Tortricidae. It is the most destructive defoliator of coniferous forests in western North America.

== Distribution ==
It is now widely distributed throughout the Rocky and Coast Mountains of Canada and the USA. The first recorded outbreak was in 1909 on the southeastern part of Vancouver Island in British Columbia, Canada. Since that year, infestations have frequently been reported in western Canada.

The Western spruce budworm was first recorded in the United States (for Oregon) in 1914. However, it was not initially recognized as a serious threat to coniferous forests in the western U.S. Aerial spraying apparently terminated some smaller epidemics in the southern and central Rockies; others subsided naturally. The insect then appeared to be dormant in U.S. forests until 1922, when two outbreaks were reported near Priest Lake in northern Idaho. Since then, significant outbreaks in the Rockies and in the Pacific Northwest have caused top-killing with serious economic losses in tree growth. Tree mortality can occur in regeneration, sapling, and pole-sized trees. Trees in mature stands severely defoliated by the western spruce budworm may become susceptible to bark beetles, which kill mature trees.

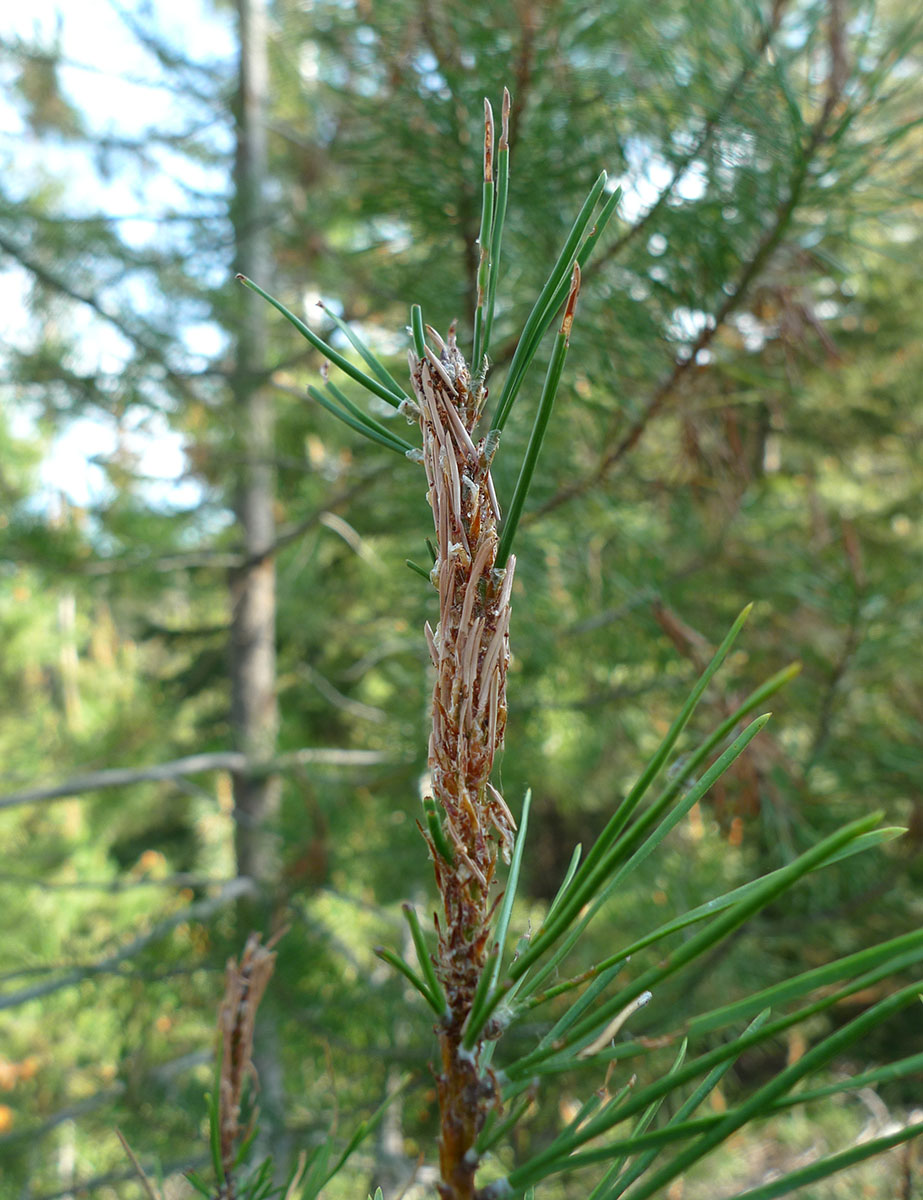
Pinus contorta ssp. latifolia defoliated by western spruce budworm (Choristoneura freemani) near Blewett Pass summit, Chelan County Washington

== Impact ==
Considered the most destructive defoliator in British Columbia, sustained outbreaks of the western spruce budworm resulted in defoliation of over 100,000 hectares (250,000 acres) in the Fraser Canyon - Lillooet - Pemberton area from 1949-58. From 1970 -2001 further outbreaks occurred over a much larger area including the area of the previous outbreaks, as well as the Thompson and South Okanagan areas in 1970-2001.

There is no typical pattern for western spruce budworm epidemics. Most of the early epidemics subsided naturally after a few years. Others persisted longer, but without spreading over large areas. An epidemic which began in 1949 in the northern Rocky Mountains has persisted for over 30 years despite insecticidal treatment of more than 6,000,000 acres (24,000 km^{2}) between 1952 and 1966.

=== Description ===
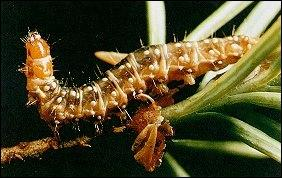
Western spruce budworm caterpillar, sixth (final) instar

Adult moths are about ^{1}/_{2} inch (12.7 mm) long and have a wing-spread of ^{7}/_{8} to 1^{1}/_{8} inches (22 to 28mm). Moths of both sexes are similar in appearance, although the females are a bit more robust than males. Both sexes fly. The gray- or orange-brown forewings are banded or streaked, and each usually has a conspicuous white dot on the wing margin. Eggs are oval, light green, and about ^{3}/_{64} inch (1.2mm) long and overlap like shingles.

Larvae develop through six stages. Newly hatched larvae are yellow-green with brown heads. In the next three stages, larvae have black heads and collars and orange- or cinnamon-brown bodies. In the fifth stage, larvae have reddish-brown heads marked with black triangles, black collars, and pale olive-brown bodies marked with small whitish spots. Mature larvae are 1 to 1^{1}/_{4} inches (25 to 32 mm) long, with tan or light chestnut-brown heads and collars and olive- or reddish-brown bodies with large ivory-colored areas.

Pupae are ^{1}/_{2} to ^{5}/_{8} inch (13 to 16 mm) long, broad at the head end, and narrower toward the tail. They are brownish yellow or brownish green at first, and later turn reddish brown.

=== Life cycle ===
Throughout most of its range, the western spruce budworm completes one cycle of development from egg to adult within 12 months. Moths emerge from pupal cases usually in late July or early August; in the southern Rockies, adults often begin emerging in early July.

The adults mate, and within 7 to 10 days, the female deposits her eggs and then dies. Each female deposits approximately 150 eggs, usually on the underside of conifer needles. Eggs are laid in one to three-row masses containing a few to 130 eggs, with an average of 25 to 40 eggs per mass.

Larvae hatch from eggs in about 10 days. Larvae do not feed, but seek sheltered places under bark scales or in and among lichens on the tree bole or limbs. Here, they spin silken tents in which they remain inactive through the winter.

In early May to late June, larvae leave their hibernacula to search for food. They first mine or tunnel into year-old needles, closed buds, or newly developing vegetative or reproductive buds.

New foliage, which is normally the preferred food, is usually entirely consumed or destroyed before larvae will feed on older needles. Larvae become full grown usually in early July about 30 to 40 days after leaving their overwintering sites.

Larvae pupate in webs of silk they have spun either at the last feeding site or elsewhere on the tree. The pupal stage usually lasts about 10 days.

== Taxonomy ==
The species was originally named Choristoneura occidentalis Freeman, 1967. However, this name has been stated as a junior homonym of a proposed recombination for another African species Cacoecia occidentalis Walsingham, 1891 (later Archips occidentalis (Walsingham, 1891), and contentiously Choristoneura occidentalis (Walsingham, 1891)). If adopted, the replacement name for the then later described North American species has been formally proposed as Choristoneura freemani Razowski, 2008. However, the need for a replacement name for the American species was then questioned, with proposals of alternative ways to revise the taxonomy. Subsequently, the recombination of Razowski, 2008 (and hence the homonym) has been refuted by Brunet et al., 2016, alongside revision of subspecies with discussion on nomenclatural issues, however without a clear alternative taxonomy for Walsingham's species (which furthermore might be a senior to another African species).
