= List of Trichogramma species =

This is a list of species within the chalcid genus Trichogramma

== Trichogramma species ==
- Trichogramma acacioi Brun, Gomez de Moraes and Soares, 1984
- Trichogramma acantholydae Pintureau and Kenis, 2000
- Trichogramma achaeae Nagaraja and Nagarkatti, 1970
- Trichogramma acuminatum Querino and Zucchi, 2003
- Trichogramma acutovirilia Pinto, 1999
- Trichogramma adashkevitshi Sorokina, 1984
- Trichogramma agriae Nagaraja, 1973
- Trichogramma agrotidis Voegele and Pintureau, 1982
- Trichogramma aldanense Sorokina, 1989
- Trichogramma alloeovirilia Querino and Zucchi, 2003
- Trichogramma alpha Pinto, 1999
- Trichogramma aomoriense Honda, 2006
- Trichogramma arcanum Pinto, 1999
- Trichogramma artonae Chen and Pang, 1986
- Trichogramma atopovirilia Oatman and Platner, 1983
- Trichogramma atropos Pinto, 1992
- Trichogramma aurosum Sugonjaev and Sorokina, 1976
- Trichogramma australicum Girault, 1912
- Trichogramma bactrianum Sugonjaev and Sorokina, 1976
- Trichogramma ballmeri Pinto, 1999
- Trichogramma bellaunionense Basso and Pintureau, 2001
- Trichogramma bennetti Nagaraja and Nagarkatti, 1973
- Trichogramma bertii Zucchi and Querino, 2003
- Trichogramma bezdencovii Bezdenko, 1968
- Trichogramma bilingense He and Pang, 2000
- Trichogramma bispinosum Pinto, 1999
- Trichogramma bistrae (Kostadinov, 1988)
- Trichogramma bourarachae Pintureau and Babault, 1988
- Trichogramma bournieri Pintureau and Babault, 1988
- Trichogramma brassicae Bezdenko, 1968
- Trichogramma brevicapillum Pinto and Platner, 1978
- Trichogramma breviciliata Yousuf and Hassan, 2007
- Trichogramma breviflagellata Yousuf (unavailable name in current taxon)
- Trichogramma brevifringiata Yousuf and Shafee, 1988
- Trichogramma browningi Pinto and Oatman, 1985
- Trichogramma bruni Nagaraja, 1983
- Trichogramma buesi Voegele, 1985
- Trichogramma buluti Bulut and Kilincer, 1991
- Trichogramma cacaeciae Marchal, 1927
- Trichogramma cacaeciae Marchal, 1927 (unavailable name in current taxon)
- Trichogramma californicum Nagaraja and Nagarkatti, 1973
- Trichogramma canadense Pinto, 1999
- Trichogramma canariense del Pino and Polaszek, 2013
- Trichogramma carina Walker, 1843
- Trichogramma carverae Oatman and Pinto, 1987
- Trichogramma castrense Velasquez de Rios and Teran, 1995
- Trichogramma cephalciae Hochmut and Martinek, 1963
- Trichogramma chilonis Ishii, 1941
- Trichogramma chilotraeae Nagaraja and Nagarkatti, 1970
- Trichogramma choui Chan and Chou, 2000
- Trichogramma chusniddini Sorokina and Atamirzaeva, 1993
- Trichogramma closterae Pang and Chen, 1974
- Trichogramma clotho Pinto, 1992
- Trichogramma colombiense Velasquez de Rios and Teran, 1995
- Trichogramma convolvuli Nagaraja, 2008
- Trichogramma cordubense Vargas and Cabello, 1985
- Trichogramma cultellus Jose, Hirose and Honda, 2005
- Trichogramma cuttackense Nagaraja, 2008
- Trichogramma danaidiphagum Nagaraja and Prasanth, 2010
- Trichogramma danausicida Nagaraja, 2008
- Trichogramma danubiense Birova and Kazimirova, 1997
- Trichogramma daumalae Dugast and Voegele, 1984
- Trichogramma deion Pinto and Oatman, 1986
- Trichogramma demoraesi Nagaraja, 1983
- Trichogramma dendrolimi Matsumura, 1926
- Trichogramma dianae Pinto, 1999
- Trichogramma diazi Velasquez de Rios and Teran, 2003
- Trichogramma dissimile Zucchi, 1988
- Trichogramma distinctum Zucchi, 1988
- Trichogramma drepanophorum Pinto and Oatman, 1985
- Trichogramma elegantum Sorokina, 1984
- Trichogramma embryophagum (Hartig, 1838)
- Trichogramma erebus Pinto, 1999
- Trichogramma erosicorne Westwood, 1879
- Trichogramma esalqueanum Querino and Zucchi, 2003
- Trichogramma ethiopicum (Risbec, 1956)
- Trichogramma euproctidis (Girault, 1911)
- Trichogramma evanescens Westwood, 1833
- Trichogramma exiguum Pinto and Platner, 1978
- Trichogramma falx Pinto and Oatman, 1996
- Trichogramma fasciatum (Perkins, 1912)
- Trichogramma flandersi Nagaraja and Nagarkatti, 1970
- Trichogramma flavum Ashmead, 1880
- Trichogramma forcipiforme Zhang and Wang, 1982
- Trichogramma fuentesi Torre, 1980
- Trichogramma funestum Pinto and Oatman, 1989
- Trichogramma funiculatum Carver, 1978
- Trichogramma fuzhouense Lin, 1994
- Trichogramma gabrielino Pinto, 1999
- Trichogramma galloi Zucchi, 1988
- Trichogramma georgia (unavailable name in current taxon)
- Trichogramma gicai Pintureau and Stefanescu, 2000
- Trichogramma gordhi Pinto, 1999
- Trichogramma guariquense Velasquez de Rios and Teran, 1995
- Trichogramma guineense (unavailable name in current taxon)
- Trichogramma hebbalensis Nagaraja, 2008
- Trichogramma hesperidis Nagaraja, 1973
- Trichogramma higai Oatman and Platner, 1982
- Trichogramma huberi Pinto, 1999
- Trichogramma infelix Pinto, 1999
- Trichogramma ingricum Sorokina, 1984
- Trichogramma interius Pinto, 1999
- Trichogramma inyoense Pinto and Oatman, 1985
- Trichogramma iracildae Querino and Zucchi, 2003
- Trichogramma itsybitsi Pinto and Stouthamer, 2002
- Trichogramma ivelae Pang and Chen, 1974
- Trichogramma jalmirezi Zucchi, 1988
- Trichogramma japonicum Ashmead, 1904
- Trichogramma jaxarticum Sorokina, 1984
- Trichogramma jezoense Ishii, 1941
- Trichogramma julianoi Platner and Oatman, 1981
- Trichogramma kalkae Schulten and Feijen, 1978
- Trichogramma kankerense Yousuf and Hassan, 2008
- Trichogramma kashmiricum Nagaraja, Ahmad and Gupta, 2007
- Trichogramma kaykai Pinto and Stouthamer, 1997
- Trichogramma kilinceri Bulut and Kilincer, 1991
- Trichogramma koehleri Blanchard, 1927
- Trichogramma kurosuae Taylor, Yashiro, Hirose and Honda, 2005
- Trichogramma lachesis Pinto, 1992
- Trichogramma lacustre Sorokina, 1978
- Trichogramma lasallei Pinto, 1999
- Trichogramma latipenne Yousuf and Hasan, 2008
- Trichogramma lenae Sorokina, 1991
- Trichogramma leptoparameron Dyurich, 1987
- Trichogramma leucaniae Pang and Chen, 1974
- Trichogramma leviculum Pinto, 1999
- Trichogramma lingulatum Pang and Chen, 1974
- Trichogramma longxishanense Lin, 1994
- Trichogramma lopezandinense Sarmiento, 1993
- Trichogramma maltbyi Nagaraja and Nagarkatti, 1973
- Trichogramma mandelai Pintureau and Babault, 1988
- Trichogramma manicobai Brun, Gomez de Moraes and Soares, 1984
- Trichogramma manii Nagaraja and Gupta, 2007
- Trichogramma maori Pinto and Oatman, 1996
- Trichogramma marandobai Brun, Gomez de Moraes and Soares, 1986
- Trichogramma margianum Sorokina, 1984
- Trichogramma marthae Goodpasture, 1986
- Trichogramma marylandense Thorpe, 1982
- Trichogramma maxacalii Voegele and Pointel, 1980
- Trichogramma meteorum Vincent, 1986
- Trichogramma minutum Riley, 1871
- Trichogramma mirabile Dyurich, 1987
- Trichogramma mirum Girault, 1922
- Trichogramma misiae Kostadinov, 1987
- Trichogramma mullensi Pinto, 1999
- Trichogramma mwanzai Schulten and Feijen, 1982
- Trichogramma nemesis Pinto, 1999
- Trichogramma nerudai Pintureau and Gerding, 1999
- Trichogramma nestoris (Kostadinov, 1991)
- Trichogramma neuropterae Chan and Chou, 1996
- Trichogramma niveiscapus (Morley, 1950)
- Trichogramma nomlaki Pinto and Oatman, 1985
- Trichogramma nubilale Ertle and Davis, 1975
- Trichogramma oatmani Torre, 1980
- Trichogramma obscurum Pinto, 1999
- Trichogramma offella Pinto and Oatman, 1985
- Trichogramma okinawae Honda, 2006
- Trichogramma oleae Voegele and Pointel, 1979
- Trichogramma ostriniae Pang and Chen, 1974
- Trichogramma pallidiventris Nagaraja, 1973
- Trichogramma panamense Pinto, 1999
- Trichogramma pangi Lin, 1987
- Trichogramma papilionidis Viggiani, 1972
- Trichogramma papilionis Nagarkatti, 1974
- Trichogramma paraplasseyensis Yousuf (unavailable name in current taxon)
- Trichogramma parkeri Nagarkatti, 1975
- Trichogramma parnarae Huo, 1986
- Trichogramma parrai Querino and Zucchi, 2003
- Trichogramma parvum Pinto, 1999
- Trichogramma pelovi Kostadinov, 1986
- Trichogramma perkinsi Girault, 1912
- Trichogramma piceum Dyurich, 1987
- Trichogramma pinneyi Schulten and Feijen, 1978
- Trichogramma pintoi Voegele, 1982
- Trichogramma pintureaui Rodriguez and Galan, 1993
- Trichogramma piracicabense Querino and Zucchi, 2017
- Trichogramma pkcal (unavailable name in current taxon)
- Trichogramma plasseyense Nagaraja, 1973
- Trichogramma platneri Nagarkatti, 1975
- Trichogramma pluto Pinto, 1999
- Trichogramma poliae Nagaraja, 1973
- Trichogramma polychrosis Chen and Pang, 1981
- Trichogramma pratissolii Querino and Zucchi, 2003
- Trichogramma pratti Pinto, 1999
- Trichogramma pretiosum Riley, 1879
- Trichogramma primaevum Pinto, 1992
- Trichogramma principium Sugonjaev and Sorokina, 1976
- Trichogramma psocopterae Chan and Chou, 1996
- Trichogramma pusillum Querino and Zucchi, 2003
- Trichogramma raoi Nagaraja, 1973
- Trichogramma retorridum (Girault, 1911)
- Trichogramma rojasi Nagaraja and Nagarkatti, 1973
- Trichogramma rossicum Sorokina, 1984
- Trichogramma sankarani Nagaraja, 2008
- Trichogramma santarosae Pinto, 1999
- Trichogramma sathon Pinto, 1999
- Trichogramma savalense Sorokina, 1991
- Trichogramma schaposchnikovi Meyer (unavailable name in current taxon)
- Trichogramma sembeli Oatman and Platner, 1982
- Trichogramma semblidis (Aurivillius, 1898)
- Trichogramma semifumatum (Perkins, 1910)
- Trichogramma semifusca Blanchard (unavailable name in current taxon)
- Trichogramma sericini Pang and Chen, 1974
- Trichogramma shaanxiense Huo, 1991
- Trichogramma shchepetilnikovae Sorokina, 1984
- Trichogramma sibiricum Sorokina, 1980
- Trichogramma siddiqi Nasir and Schoeller, 2011
- Trichogramma silvestre Sorokina, 1984
- Trichogramma singularis Girault, 1932
- Trichogramma sinuosum Pinto, 1999
- Trichogramma sogdianum Sorokina, 1984
- Trichogramma sorokinae Kostadinov, 1986
- Trichogramma stampae Vincent, 1986
- Trichogramma sugonjaevi Sorokina, 1984
- Trichogramma suorangelica Pinto, 1999
- Trichogramma taiwanense Chan and Chou, 2000
- Trichogramma tajimaense Yashiro, Hirose and Honda, 2012
- Trichogramma talitzkii Dyurich, 1987
- Trichogramma tenebrosum Oatman and Pinto, 1987
- Trichogramma terani Velasquez de Rios and Teran, 2003
- Trichogramma thalense Pinto and Oatman, 1985
- Trichogramma tielingense Zhang and Wang, 1982
- Trichogramma trjapitzini Sorokina, 1984
- Trichogramma tshumakovae Sorokina, 1984
- Trichogramma tupiense Querino and Zucchi, 2003
- Trichogramma turkeiense Bulut and Kilincer, 1991
- Trichogramma turkestanicum Meyer, 1940
- Trichogramma umerus Jose, Hirose and Honda, 2005
- Trichogramma urquijoi Cabello Garcia, 1986
- Trichogramma ussuricum Sorokina, 1984
- Trichogramma valentinei Pinto and Oatman, 1996
- Trichogramma valmiri Querino and Zucchi, 2017
- Trichogramma vargasi Oatman and Platner, 1982
- Trichogramma viggianii Pinto, 1999
- Trichogramma yabui Honda and Taylor, 2006
- Trichogramma yawarae Hirai and Fursov, 1998
- Trichogramma zahiri Polaszek, 2002
- Trichogramma zeirapherae Walter, 1985
- Trichogramma zeta Pinto, 1999
- Trichogramma zucchii Querino, 2003
