= T. brassicae =

T. brassicae may refer to:

- Trichogramma brassicae, a polyphagous wasp
- Tubercularia brassicae, a fungus in the family Nectriaceae
- Tuberculariella brassicae, a fungus in the family Dermateaceae
