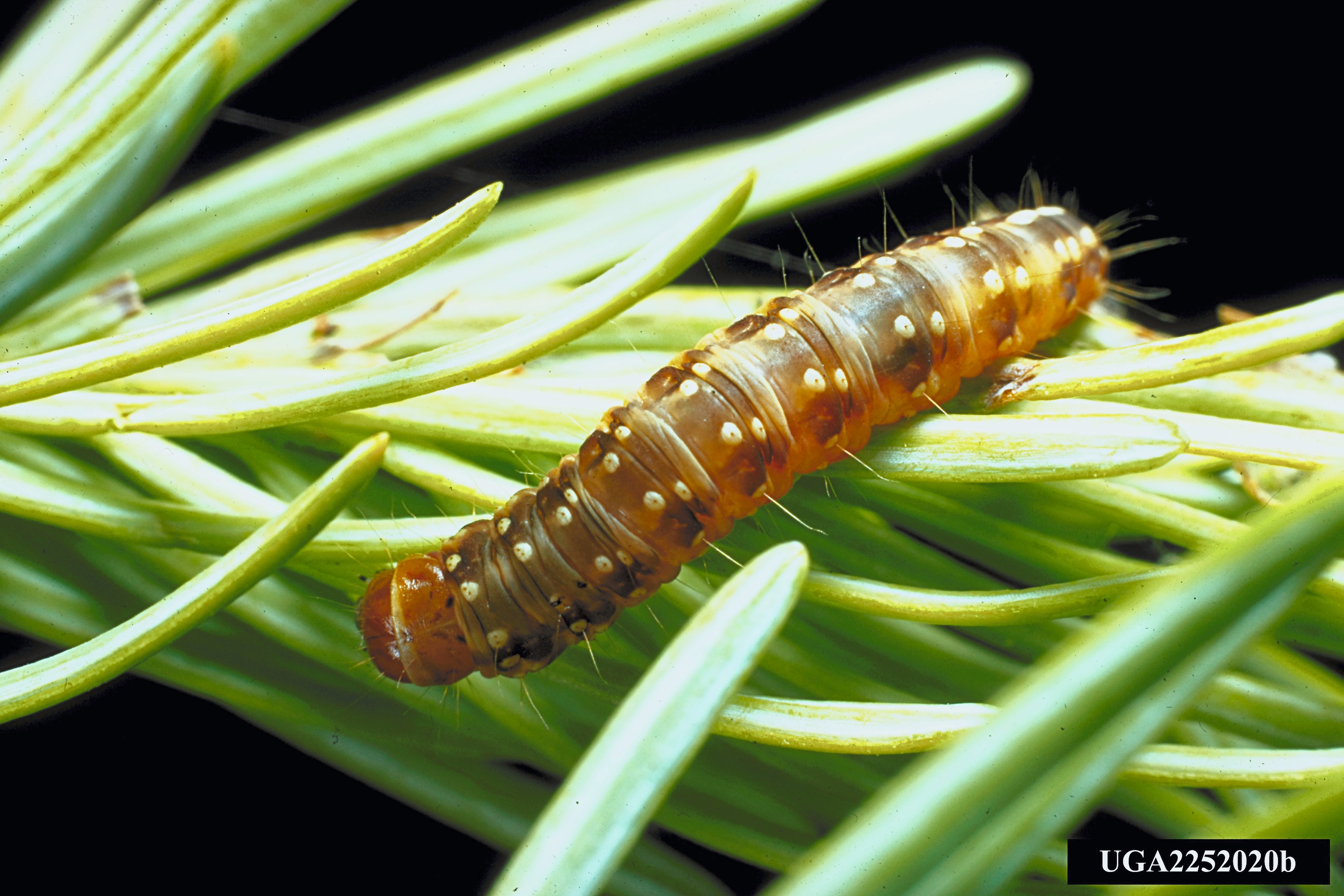
- Choristoneura fumiferana caterpillar

Scientific classification
- Kingdom: Animalia
- Phylum: Arthropoda
- Clade: Pancrustacea
- Class: Insecta
- Order: Lepidoptera
- Family: Tortricidae
- Genus: Choristoneura
- Species: C. fumiferana

Binomial name
- Choristoneura fumiferana (Clemens, 1865)

Synonyms
- Tortrix fumiferana Clemens, 1865; Tortrix nigrida Beutenmuller, 1892; Tortrix nigridia Robinson, 1869

= Choristoneura fumiferana =

Species of moth

Choristoneura fumiferana, the eastern spruce budworm, is a species of moth of the family Tortricidae native to the eastern United States and Canada. The caterpillars feed on the needles of spruce and fir trees. Eastern spruce budworm populations can experience significant oscillations, with large outbreaks sometimes resulting in wide scale tree mortality. The first recorded outbreaks of the spruce budworm in the United States occurred in about 1807, and since 1909 there have been waves of budworm outbreaks throughout the eastern United States and Canada. In Canada, the major outbreaks occurred in periods circa 1910–20, c. 1940–50, and c. 1970–80, each of which impacted millions of hectares of forest. Longer-term tree-ring studies suggest that spruce budworm outbreaks have been recurring approximately every three decades since the 16th century, and paleoecological studies suggest the spruce budworm has been breaking out in eastern North America for thousands of years.

Budworm outbreaks can have significant economic impacts on the forestry industry. As a result, the eastern spruce budworm is considered one of the most destructive forest pests in North America, and various methods of control are utilized. However, the species is also ecologically important, and several bird species are specialised on feeding on budworms during the breeding season. Several theories exist to explain the cyclical budworm outbreaks.

== Taxonomy ==
Clemens originally named the eastern spruce budworm, C. fumiferana, in 1865, which was recognized as a Nearctic representative of the genus Choristoneura. At this time, the name applied to populations in a variety of geographic regions and biotopes. The C. pinus, a distinct form of the Choristoneura, was later established as a separate species. However, a large group of this genus in the western part of North America remained taxonomically undefined as the "western complex" until T.N. Freeman established several new species in 1967. Field collections of late instar larvae of Choristoneura populations were taken from a range of localities in a wide arc, from the Atlantic seaboard along the edge of the Laurentian Shield to the Mackenzie River area near the Arctic Ocean. From these collections, only points east of the Rocky Mountain foothills yielded C. fumiferana. The two-year-cycle budworm C. biennis occurs only in the subalpine forest region, with alpine fir and Alberta spruce as hosts. Budworm populations from Rocky Mountain regions south of the area of introgressive hybridization of spruce differ from C. biennis. Other budworms are of little or no consequence with respect to spruces.

== Range and habitat ==
The range of the eastern spruce budworm is the largest of all budworms and coincides with the range of its hosts: fir and spruce trees in eastern North America, primarily in Canada. It includes the Boreal Forest as well as the Great Lakes-St. Lawrence, Northern, and Acadian forest regions. This range extends westward to Alaska. The spruce budworm is commonly found in boreal and sub-boreal forest regions, specifically those that consist of spruce–fir forests.

== Food resources ==
=== Host plant preferences ===
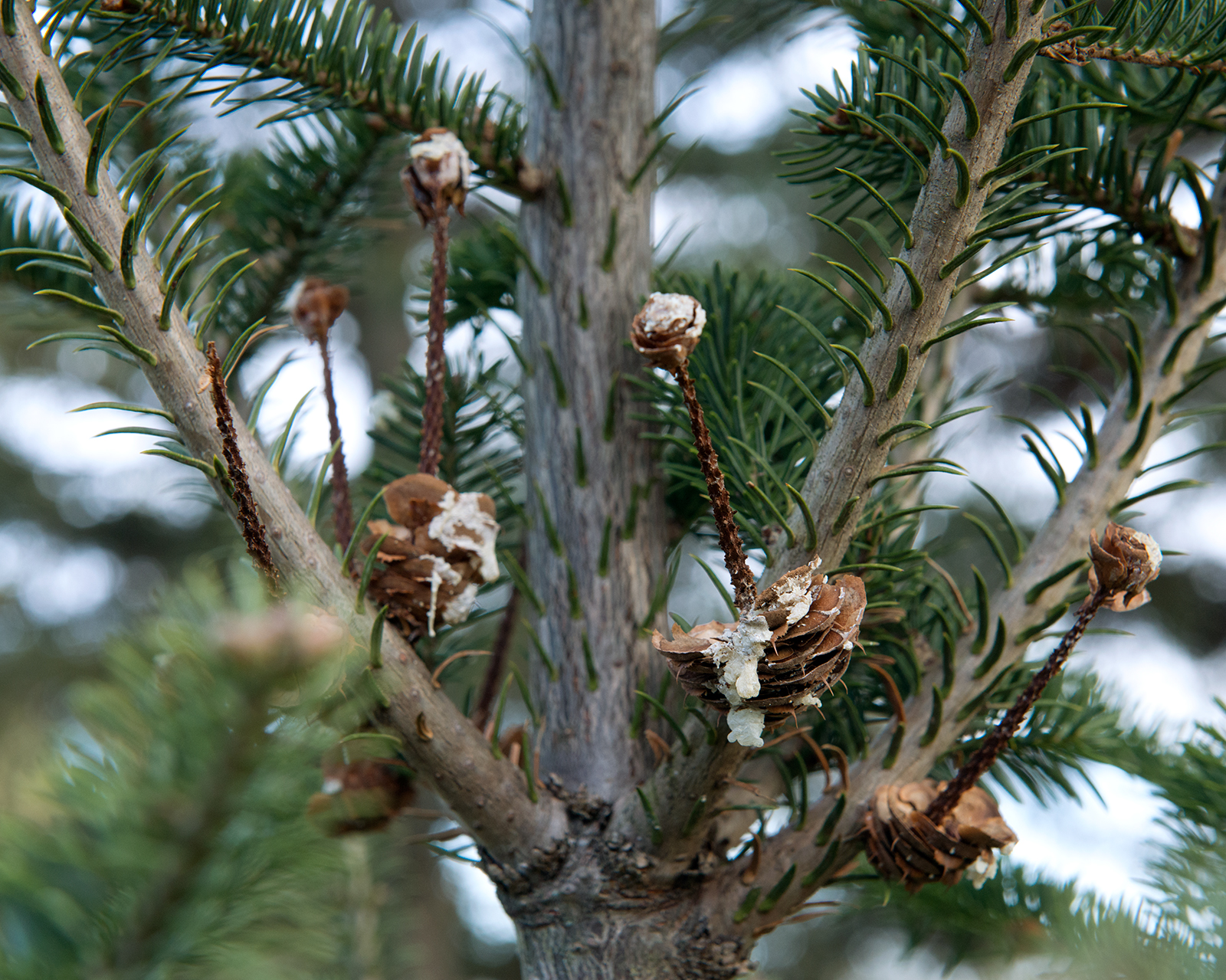
Abies balsamea, a favored host tree

The main hosts of the eastern spruce budworm in eastern North America are balsam fir, white spruce, and black spruce, but the larvae feed almost exclusively on current-year needles of balsam fir and white spruce. In massive outbreaks, populations of the insect can become so high that the larvae will feed on old foliage after the current-year foliage has been depleted.

Traditionally, the eastern spruce budworm prefers balsam fir over white spruce. However, one study showed contradicting evidence. In this study, Bichon sampled spruce budworm populations on branches from the upper mid-crowns of dominant or co-dominant balsam fir and white spruce. This was done at 20 randomly selected points in the Black Sturgeon Lake area near Thunder Bay, Ontario. The number of late-instar larvae captured in water traps was recorded throughout the dispersal period of the late instar larvae. The data indicated that white spruce canopies contained 2 to 3 times more spruce budworm than balsam fir canopies. A similar pattern was found in the understory. Water traps under white spruce trees captured more than 3 times as many larvae as did those under balsam fir trees for most of the dispersal period.

=== Impact on hosts ===
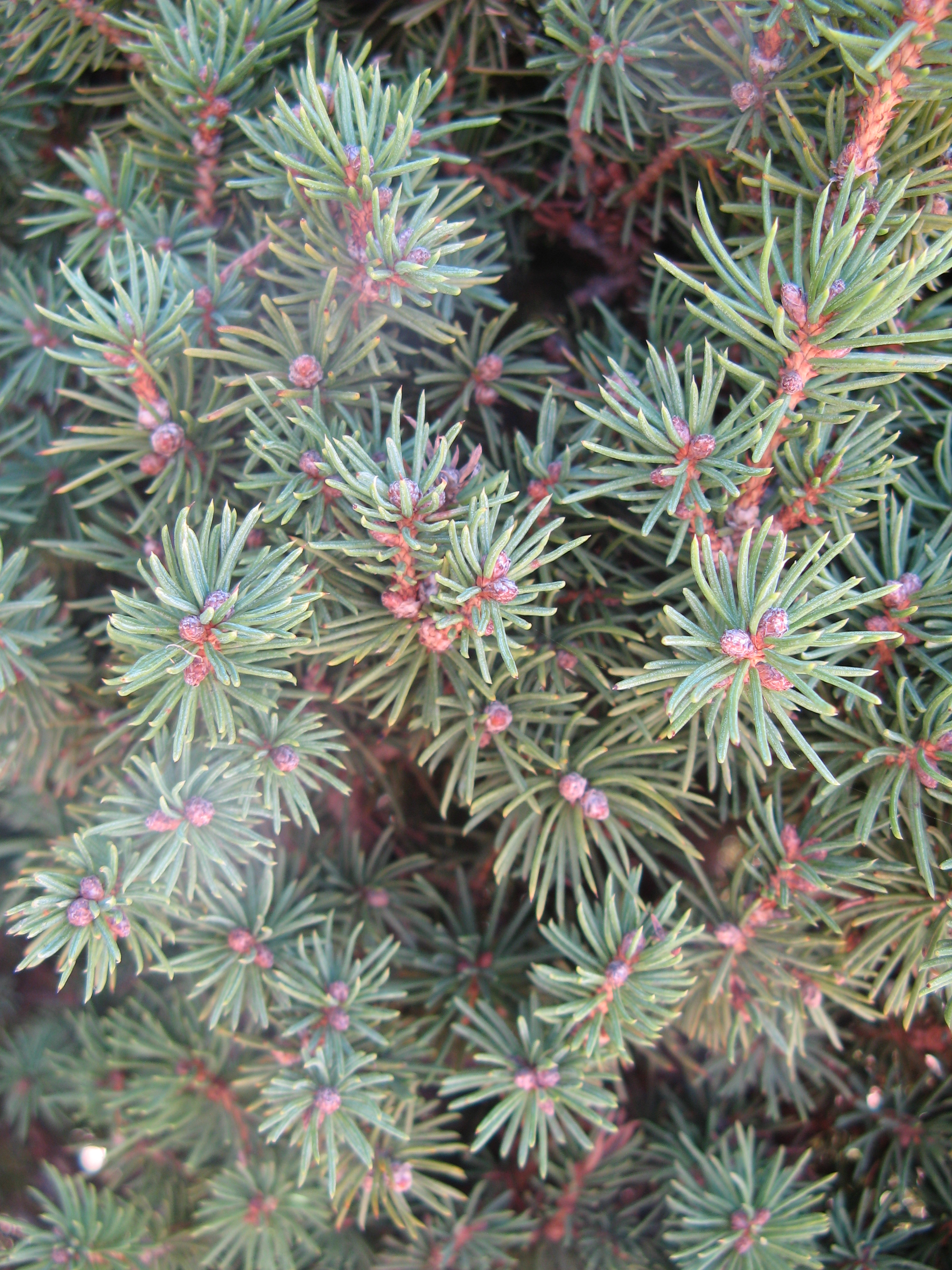
White spruce, a host tree

Balsam fir is the most susceptible host to outbreaks of the spruce budworm. Annual defoliation of current-year growth for 5 to 8 years will kill the host tree. Defoliation by the spruce budworm is most clearly reflected in the fir's radial growth. The population of mature balsam fir in a forest is greatly reduced by a combination of factors: its shorter lifespan and a great vulnerability to lethal budworm attacks. The dietary preference for balsam fir over white spruce has the potential to alter the structure and composition of spruce-fir forests. Similarly, the next-generation stand of trees are influenced by the late instar larvae that disperse to the understory of the forest and feed on the regeneration of plants. During a 1957 budworm outbreak in Quebec, balsam fir mortality was greater than 75% in stands in which no mortality was reported among the smaller component of white spruce.

However, while balsam fir is the preferred host, severe outbreaks have occurred among white spruce stands in the Prairie Provinces and Northwest Territories containing little or no balsam fir. The white spruce is less susceptible to budworm attack but can experience extreme defoliation during severe outbreaks. Young white spruce and black spruce trees that had been transplanted to cleared areas became infested with dozens of late-stage larvae during severe outbreaks in north-central Ontario. Mortality among white spruce also occurred in northwestern Ontario and the Algoma District of Ontario, as well as in certain areas of New Brunswick.

Significant damage is also caused to subalpine fir. Red spruce, in its limited distribution, and tamarack are also attacked.

=== Food shortage ===
Food shortages can occur in budworm populations if the budworms kill a significant amount of trees in the stand, such as during outbreaks. When food becomes depleted, the larvae feed on old foliage, which will result in slowed development and reduced fecundity in the female moths. However, food shortages generally do not lead to larval mortality.

=== Microbiome ===
The midgut microbiota of the spruce budworm larvae is primarily composed of Pseudomonadota, mainly from the genus Pseudonomas. Two specific species from this genus are P. fluorescens and P. paea. Enterococcus and Staphylococcus bacteria were found in lower abundance as well.

Diet plays a role in influencing the gut microbiome. One study found possible negative consequences of ingesting balsam fir as it may release juices that adversely affect the midgut microbiota.

== Reproduction and life cycle ==
=== Mating ===
==== Pheromones and mate choice ====
As with other species in the genus Choristoneura, spruce budworm females produce sex pheromones to attract males as potential mates and enhance their base level of sexual activity. C. fumiferana females emit aldehydes, using a 95:5 mix of E- and Z11-tetradecenals (E/Z11-14Ald) while some other species of Choristoneura emit acetates and alcohols. The pheromone is made with palmitate using β-oxidation and Δ11-desaturation and stored as unsaturated E/Z11-14Ac.

Male size is an important factor in reproductive success, but male C. fumiferana also emit a pheromone that helps attract females. This pheromone becomes available through larval and adult feeding. While attempting to copulate, males will exhibit their abdominal hair pencils to the female. These hair pencils release a volatile pheromone and play a role in attracting females. The chemical composition of the volatile pheromone is currently unknown. Some studies suggest that these pheromones are indicators of male mate quality and prevent other males from approaching the female.

Females exhibit selective mate choice as they show more parental investment. Pheromones allow females to recognize and assess males as mates. Male C. fumiferana prefer to mate with virgin females.

==== Copulation ====
Female C. fumiferana start accepting males for copulation early in the day, and a good number of females are active by sunset. Before attempting to mate, the male will spread its abdominal hairs and fan its wings as either the wing glands or the hairs have a scent to which females respond. The moths perform end-to-end mating with attached genitalia. Males will mate guard throughout prolonged copulation with the female. Mating lasts around 3 hours. Increased mating times are correlated with increased production of fertile eggs. When mating is interrupted, the C. fumiferana female may oviposit infertile eggs or resume mating with other males. Consecutive matings in male C. fumiferana lead to an overall decline in male reproductive performance: decreased spermatophore mass, increased mating time, and a smaller amount of sperm produced.

==== Nuptial gifts ====
Upon copulation, males transfer a spermatophore containing its ejaculate and additional nutrients to the female, which functions as a nuptial gift. This gift is an important display of male investment because females may only have a few mature eggs to be fertilized upon emergence from the pupae. Male larval nutrition influences the quality, size, and weight of the spermatophore with increased nutrition having a positive effect. During outbreak periods when food is scarcer, larvae will feed on old foliage and receive less nutrition. Males that feed on young foliage have been found to grow bigger, produce larger spermatophores, and often have more success in attracting a female.

=== Oviposition ===
Female moths lay one brood per season, and eggs are laid over several days. The number of eggs per egg mass varies from 1 to about 60, but there are 20 eggs on average per mass. These masses are laid in 2 to 4 rows on conifer foliage, preferably balsam fir and spruce needles. Generally, females can lay 100 to 300 eggs in a lifetime but average approximately 200 eggs. These eggs hatch after around 10 days, but this period ranges from 8 to 12 days. The spruce budworm oviposits on needles of host trees in late June or mid-July to early August. Large numbers of egg masses are deposited on the peripheral shoots of the crown.

=== Host plant learning and selection for egg laying ===
C. fumiferana females are univoltine (laying one brood per year) and must make careful decisions about oviposition sites. Selection is based on chemical cues, shape, and structure of the cuticular wax on the site. Studies have shown that sensilla important in detecting this information may be located on the moth's legs. When evaluating the host plant, the moth drums its forelegs against the surface and likely scratches the leaf with its tarsal claws on their feet, which releases compounds detected by the moth's chemoreceptors. Unsuccessfully mated and virgin females are less adept at probing oviposition sites due to unactivated sensilla.

=== Life history ===
==== Egg ====
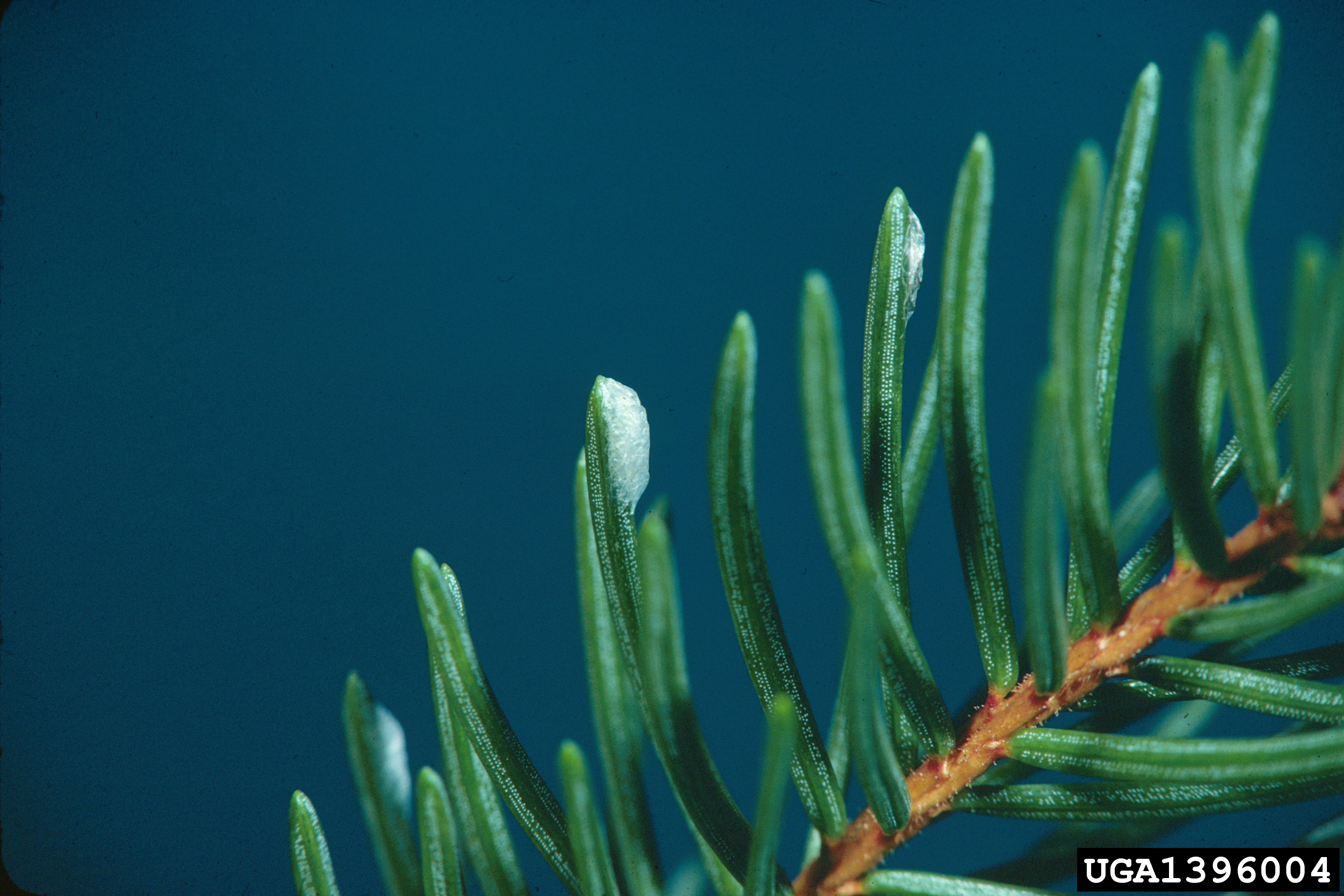
Eggs

Eggs are light green in color and laid in several overlapping rows within masses on the host plant. They hatch 8–12 days after they are laid.

==== Caterpillar ====
After dispersal, first-instar caterpillars create hibernacula preferably inside flower bracts and beneath bark scales. They then molt to the second instar without feeding and overwinter as second-instar larvae in diapause. The second-instar larvae emerge in early May and disperse to feed on seed, pollen cones, flower bracts, and needles at host trees, preferably the balsam fir. In June and July, larvae in third to sixth instars feed on current-year shoots then old foliage after the shoots are depleted. 90% of a larva's food consumption occurs after the sixth instar, which is when the most damage is caused to host trees.

Young caterpillars are a cream color when they hatch. Late instar larvae have dark brown heads and prothoracic shields and are 3 centimeters long when fully developed. Their bodies are also dark brown but have light spots on the back.

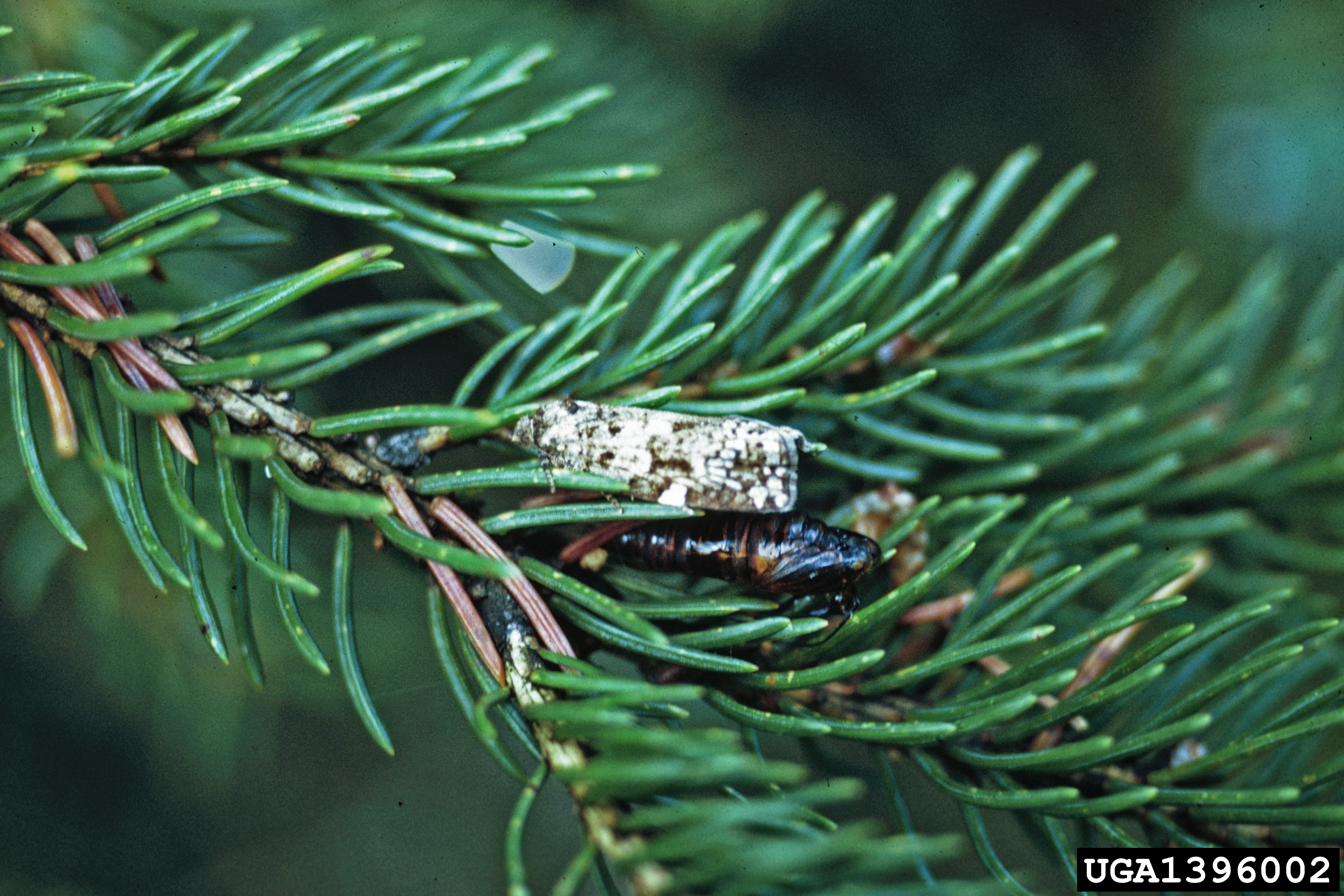
Adult and pupa

==== Pupa ====
The pupae are formed in early July on foliage in the forests. Both sexes of C. fumiferana pupae are initially light green then later range in color from black to a reddish-brown. They are approximately 12 to 15 millimeters long.

==== Adult ====
The moths will emerge from the pupae within 8 to 12 days, during mid-June to August. Adult spruce budworm are medium-sized (15 mm in length) and dichromatic, exhibiting gray and rust colors. The wings have silvery patches and are 21 mm to 30 mm in wingspan. Peak activity occurs during the later afternoon and early evening. After emerging, the adults will mate and lay eggs in July or August.

The lifetime of the C. fumiferana lasts around 2 years. Pupae last for around 10 days, and adult moths live for approximately 2 weeks. In one year, there is one generation of offspring.

== Migration ==
=== Local or regional dispersal ===
After the eggs hatch, first-instar caterpillars will disperse from the oviposition site throughout the tree or stand using silk strands. They are sometimes carried further by the wind. In early May, the second-instar larvae emerge and disperse to host trees. The majority of larval mortality occurs during fall and spring dispersal.

Eastern spruce budworm moths are strong fliers and disperse in exodus in the evening. They can fly at elevations over 100 meters before going to a new site, which is typically only 50 to 100 kilometers downwind, but can sometimes be up to 450 km away. After depositing some eggs at the first dispersion site, female moths may emigrate and lay eggs at multiple sites. Factors controlling budworm flight during dispersal include meteorological conditions and temperature. Moths will not disperse when the temperature is below 14°C or above 30°C. When the temperature drops below 14°C mid-flight, the moth will fold its wings and descend from the sky.

=== Long distance migration ===
Long-distance migration of the spruce budworm does occur as they can disperse across distances ranging from 20 to 450 km. In northern Minnesota, spruce budworm moths emigrate to the east lakeshore of Lake Superior in Ontario, Canada, because of seasonal changes. Dispersal is influenced heavily by temperature as low temperatures can slow down both take off and arrival. Other factors include dispersal direction, precipitation, altitude, and wind flow. It is likely that mass exoduses of the C. fumiferana over long distances are a result of food shortage in the local area. The spruce budworm atmospheric transport model provides daily updated simulations of spruce budworm mass migrations across eastern North America.

== Predators ==
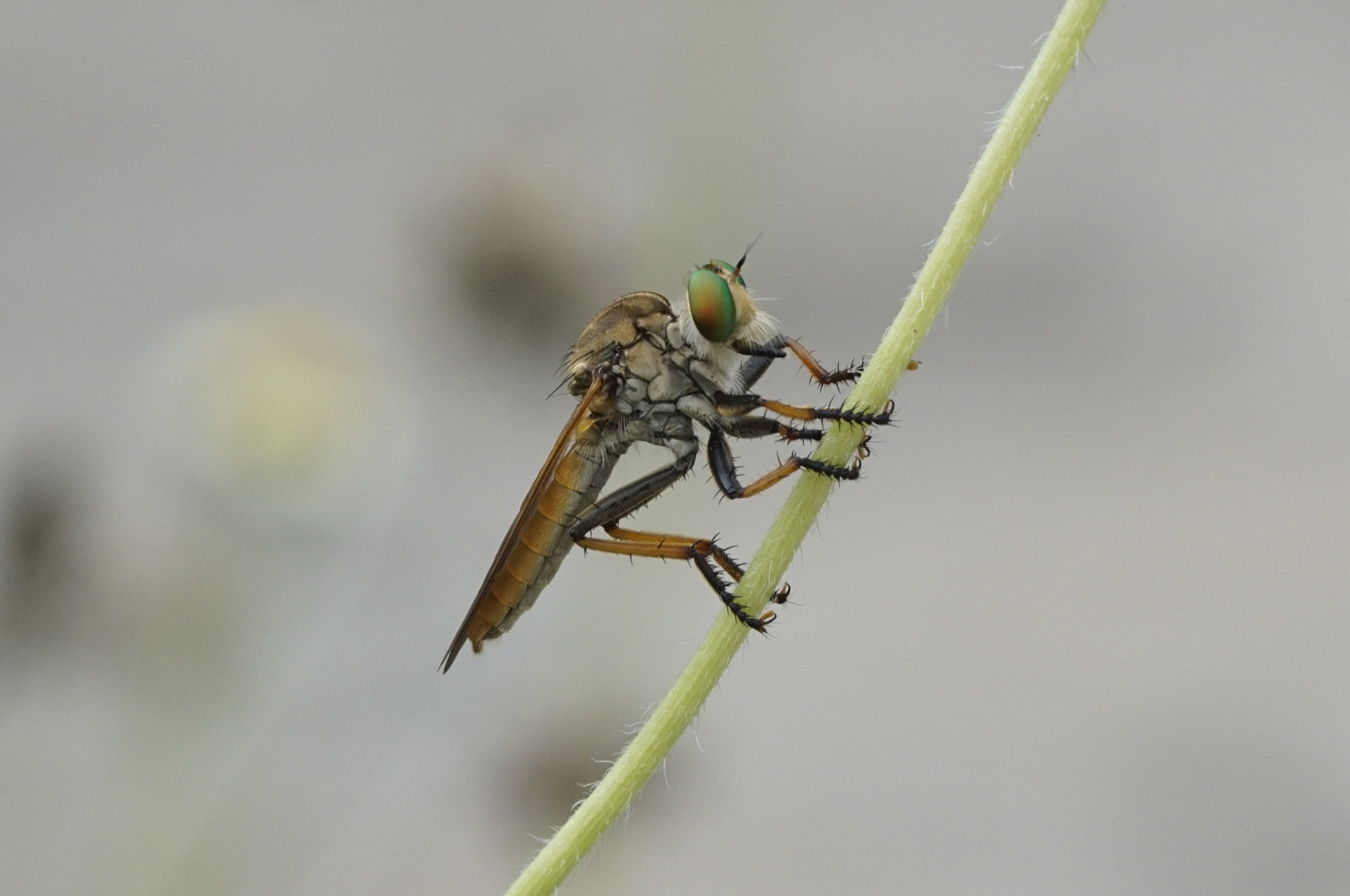
A robber fly

Eastern spruce budworm egg masses are immobile and less vulnerable to predation than other stages of the cycle. Small larvae are exposed to predators during dispersal but become safer while bud or needle mining or overwintering in hibernacula. Large larvae actively escape predation by dropping from the tree foliage, which can also attract the attention of other predators. Predators outside of host plants on the forest floor include ants, spiders, beetles, and small mammals. Pupae are vulnerable because the budworm are generally immobile in this state. The adult moths can fly away from predators but are then exposed to various birds, dragonflies, and robber flies. Spruce budworm male and female moths experience increased vulnerability during copulation.

Insectivorous birds are a common and major predator of the spruce budworm, mainly preying on the larvae and pupae. Examples of species include sparrows, thrushes, and overstory warblers. Bird distribution will change to reflect budworm density in the forests. A 1989 study found that the highest populations of spruce budworm larvae and pupae occur in June and July. This coincides with the period when some species of birds require maximum food to feed their young. As a result, predation by birds helps control the growth of budworm predation. Other major predators include various invertebrates, primarily spiders.

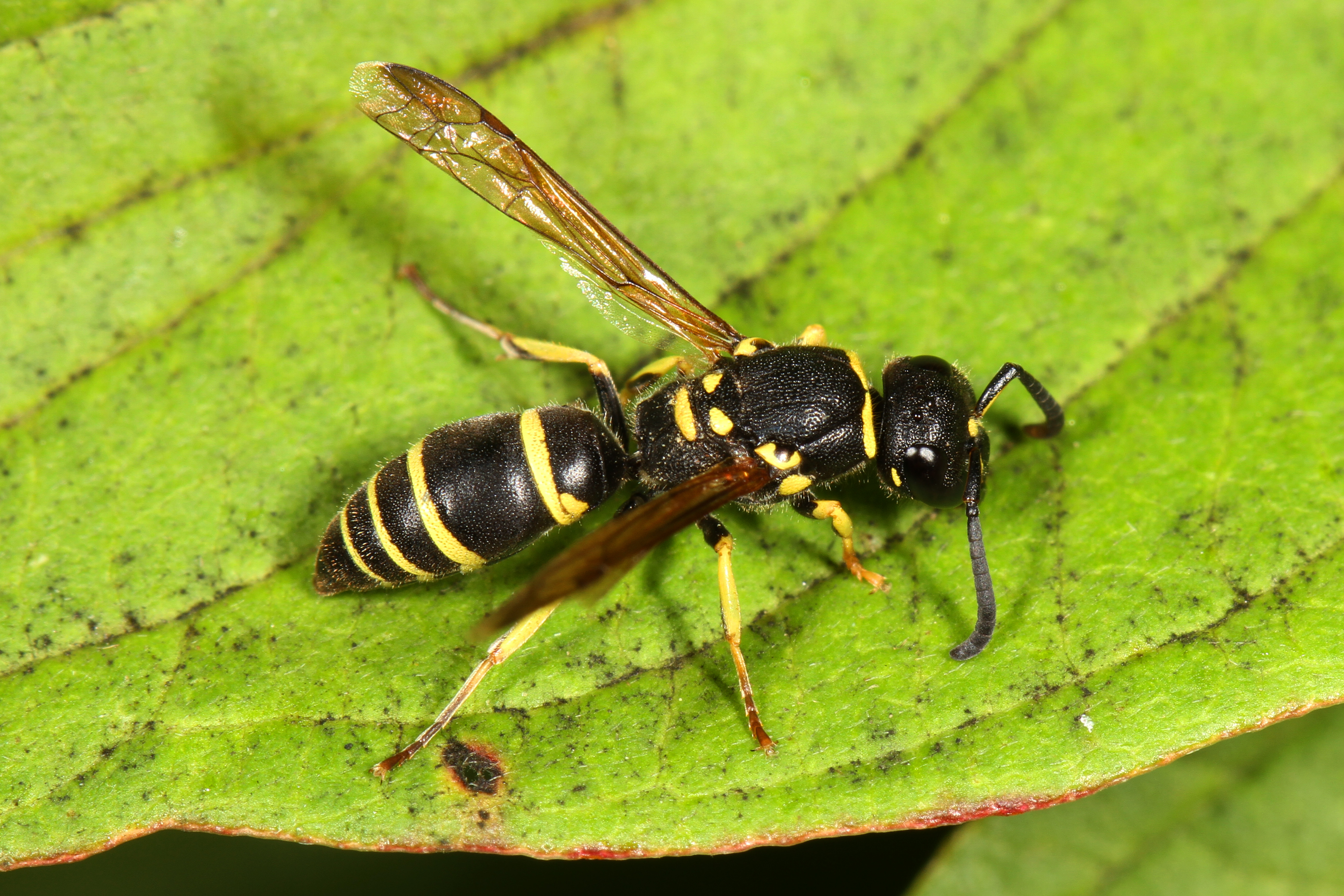
Ancistrocerus adiabatus, a predator

In spruce-fir forests throughout Maine, the late-instar spruce budworm larvae is preyed on by eumenid wasps such as the A. adiabatus, and E. leucomelas. This predation is important in controlling populations of the spruce budworm in forest stands.

Spruce budworm larvae are attacked by parasitoids from the Hymenoptera and Diptera orders, which include common wasps such as Apanteles fumiferanae and Glypta fumiferanae. First- and second-instar larvae are parasitized in the summer. When they are in their fourth or higher instars the next summer, the larvae are killed by the newly emerged wasps. Other species of parasitoid wasps (e.g. Meteorus trachynotus) will attack the larvae when they are in their third to fourth instars, emerging during the sixth instar or from the pupae.

About 90 parasitoids have been collected from spruce budworm in eastern North America. In 1996, Henry found that the suite of parasitoids collected from spruce budworm in isolated white spruce plantations of southern Ontario differed from the usual suite of parasitoids found in the boreal forest.

== Physiology ==
=== Thermoregulation ===
Weather and variances in temperature can influence the larval development of the spruce budworm. During the cold winters, the larvae overwinter in their hibernaculae in true diapause until they can resume growth in the springtime. When the weather is warm in late fall and early spring, the budworm may metabolize at a higher rate, which depletes its finite food resources while in the hibernaculae. Harsher winters are associated with declines in population, even reaching 49% mortality. This is either due to the frigid temperatures or cumulative effect of the cold over time. Frost can be deadly to these early-instar larvae. Warm spring temperatures may also have multiple effects. After emergence, it may prompt more dispersal which increases mortality, but this is hard to determine. It is more likely to help development and increase survival. Overall, cold, wet temperature may be detrimental during this larval period while hot and dry summer weather is most favorable.

=== Diapause ===
During diapause, the C. fumiferana larvae have low metabolic activity and stalled developmental growth. After the first instar, they enter diapause and overwinter. Spruce budworms may overwinter twice, and thus enter diapause twice, when they are on a two-year life cycle. This can occur in the spruce-balsam forests of central and southern British Columbia and of the Rocky Mountains. Larvae have been observed to end the first diapause in the summer and develop slowly until they enter diapause as fourth-instar larvae. They then emerge the following spring and develop into adults by late July. Two-year life cycles typically occur in regions with low average daily temperatures and short, frost-free seasons. In general, diapause is environmentally determined.

== Outbreaks ==
Paleoecological studies suggest the spruce budworm has been breaking out in eastern North America for thousands of years.

=== Theories ===
Populations of C. fumiferana can increase and decrease rapidly during short periods of time. Outbreaks occur as the population suddenly increases before crashing once again. According to one common theory (the double equilibrium hypothesis), popularized in the 1970s, periodic outbreaks of the spruce budworm are a part of the natural cycle of events associated with the maturing of balsam fir. A key point is that outbreak frequency cannot be predicted. The catastrophe theory of budworm outbreaks holds that particularly major infestations occur every 40–60 years, as the result of a cusp-catastrophe event, whereby populations jump suddenly from endemic to epidemic levels. An alternative theory holds that outbreaks are the result of spatially synchronized population oscillations that are caused by delayed density-dependent feedback (from various mortality agents) which are synchronized via a process of entrainment as per Moran's theorem. Finally, the epicenter theory describes a model in which outbreaks begin at an epicenter and spread outward through dispersal. These epicenters have less destruction overall and tend to occur in the Great Lakes-St. Lawrence forest corridor. From these epicenters, the outbreak will spread and combine with other epicenters to create a larger epidemic.

=== Evidence ===
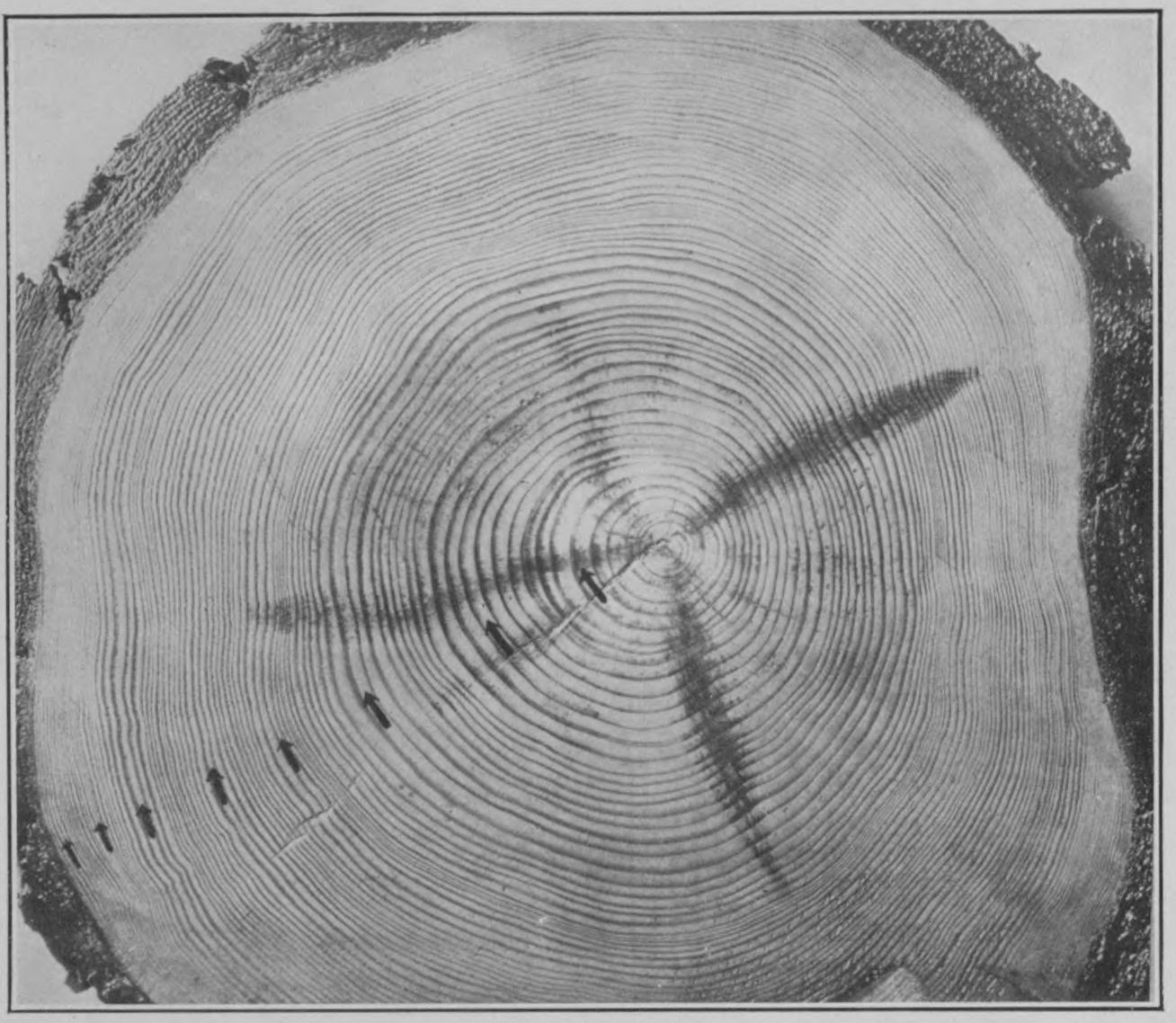
Tree rings of varying widths record cycles of climate and budworm outbreaks

Balsam fir can provide evidence of outbreaks with its radial-growth data. However, it generally cannot be used to obtain information on outbreaks that occurred more than 75 years previously.

White spruce is also particularly useful for providing evidence of past outbreaks of spruce budworm through radial-growth data. They can provide excellent records from as far back as 200, sometimes 300, years. Although the white spruce is more resistant to budworm attack than balsam fir, heavy defoliation can occur during severe outbreaks, which results in reduction of radial growth. In lesser outbreaks, radial growth is moderately reduced, which often makes it difficult to distinguish if it is caused by random or weather-related fluctuations. Comparisons between radial growth in host trees and non-host trees (especially white and red pines) are used to detect the budworm effect.

=== Occurrences ===
Spruce budworm outbreaks usually first appear in localized areas before spreading to immense territories. Population explosions can be astonishingly rapid. For example, in the Kedgwick Lake area of Quebec, egg sampling in summer 1959 had indicated that budworm populations would be low in 1960, but a much larger population developed in response to favorable weather and food conditions. Such situations are unlikely to recur frequently, but it is common for populations of larvae to be spread through wind dispersal. Unfavorable weather in the spring can strongly influence both budworm and host development.

Massive outbreaks of spruce budworm occur irregularly throughout the range, but populations of this insect can remain at an endemic level for long periods. In 1943, a continuing outbreak in Ontario and western Quebec caused heavy mortality, particularly in stands of balsam fir. Half of the 25 million cords (90,615,000 m^{3}) of balsam fir standing in 1931 were estimated to have died or been injured beyond recovery. Millions of cords of white spruce were also probably killed. Atwood noted increased difficulty of logging in affected stands as well as an increased risk of fire.

Turner found evidence of a budworm attack in the Lake Nipigon region of Ontario occurring with the 1704 outbreak in Quebec's Laurentide Park. This was based on the pattern of radial growth in a single 300-year-old white spruce tree that showed a characteristic budworm suppression pattern beginning in 1702 and lasting for 10 years. Intensive searches failed to find other white spruces of similar age.

Instead of affecting the entire area available for budworm infestation, past outbreaks have tended to occur in separate regions. For example, in the lower St. Lawrence and Gaspé regions, radial-growth studies of balsam fir and white spruce confirmed outbreaks known to have taken place in lower St. Lawrence in 1878 and 1912. The Gaspé area was thought to have escaped those outbreaks, but Blais found that the 1912 outbreak had covered more than 2 million ha in that region. Within affected regions, epidemics did not recur regularly. In 1965, Blais obtained further evidence from the radial growth on basal disks of balsam fir, white spruce, and black spruce (susceptible species), and non-susceptible white pine in the Laurentide Park, Quebec. He concluded that outbreaks occurred in 1704, 1748, 1808, 1834, 1910, and 1947. The more recent outbreaks seemed to be more severe than earlier ones, possibly due to an increase of highly susceptible balsam fir and a decrease of less susceptible white spruce following harvesting operations.

Blais (1968) stated specifically that "Epidemics of this insect did not recur regularly within regions. The time of occurrence of future outbreaks therefore cannot be predicted with accuracy on the basis of the periodicity of past ones". His skepticism about the ability to predict the timing and intensity of outbreaks is not consistent with Royama's idea of periodic outbreaks as spatially synchronized population oscillations. The timing and the intensity of outbreaks is not easy to predict with accuracy, either before or after Blais (1968), because of the highly variable intensities of outbreaks and a lack of periodicity and synchrony in outbreak patterning. The dynamics of population fluctuations across eastern Canada through the 20th century appear to be more complex and more nonlinear than Royama supposed, which is consistent with Blais, with catastrophe theory, and with the epicenter theory of dispersal-driven eruptions.

== Interactions with humans ==
=== Pest of forests ===
The eastern spruce budworm Choristoneura fumiferana has been called "the most destructive forest insect in North America." Massive budworm epidemics erupt periodically in spruce–fir forests in northern and eastern Canada. Populations of spruce budworm vary in density over several orders of magnitude. Recorded densities in the boreal forest range from less than 0.01 to over 100 larvae per 45 cm branch tip. Damage to trees in forests can begin even before the buds have flushed. Early instar larvae mine and kill these buds. Late instar larvae are voracious feeders, chewing off needles at their bases. In heavy infestations, old foliage is also eaten. Increment loss, tree deformity, and tree mortality follow several years of heavy infestation.

Defoliation of trees reduces their photosynthetic capacity and therefore curtails growth. In conifers, reduction in radial growth does not normally coincide with the first year of defoliation. For instance, the ring width of white spruce showed reduced growth throughout the stem beginning in the year after defoliation by the European spruce sawfly (Gilpinia hercyniae Htg.). One preliminary study showed that, during the first 3 or 4 years, repeated severe defoliation of white spruce by the spruce budworm was not reflected in reduced radial growth. However, in the Lac Seul infestation in northwestern Ontario, apparent radial growth suppression in white spruce first occurred in the 2nd and 3rd years of severe defoliation.

=== Control ===
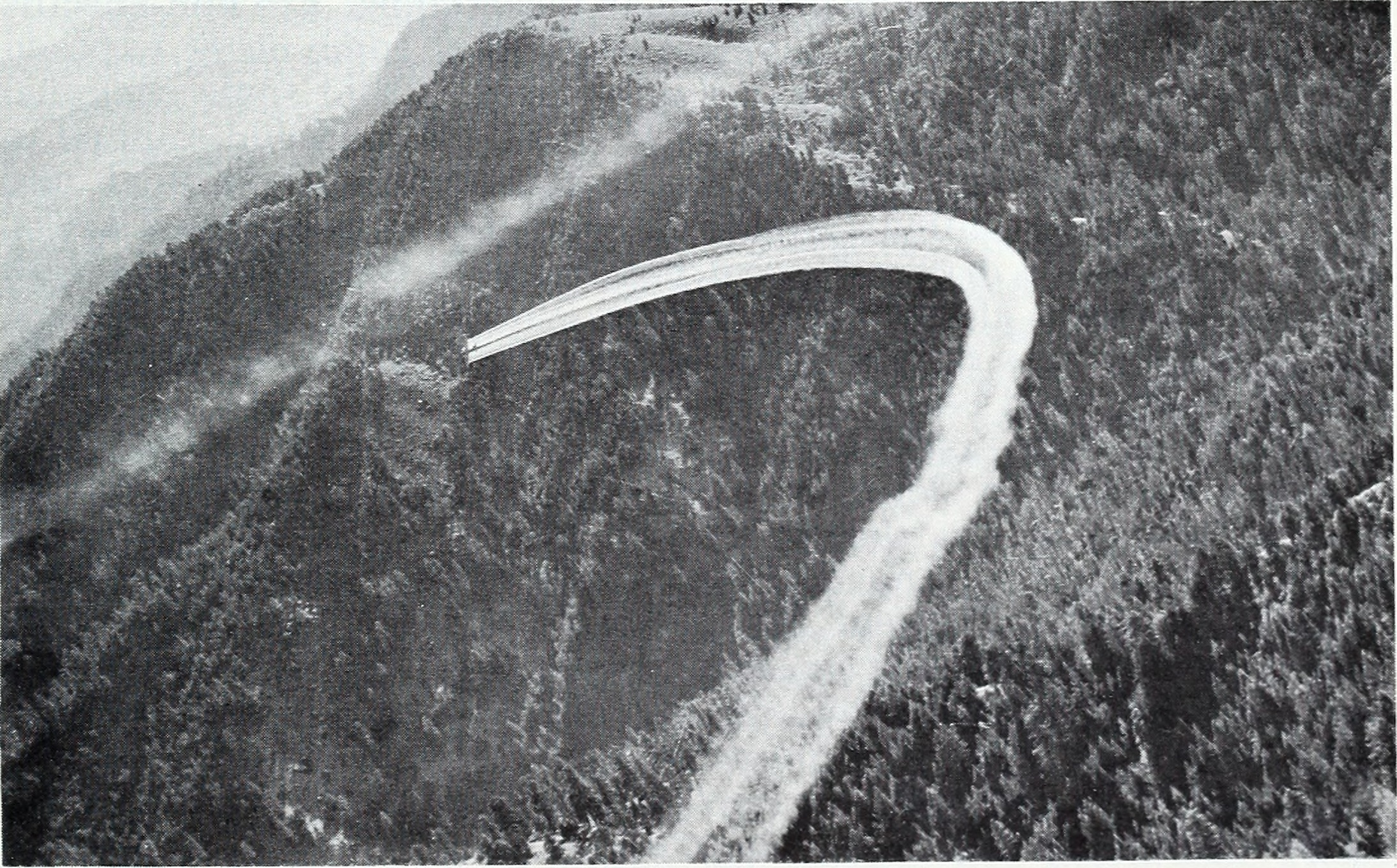
Airplane spraying pesticide to control spruce budworm populations

Pest management of the eastern spruce budworm is often undertaken due to the incompatibility of budworm outbreaks with some human uses of the same forest. Management occurs through some manipulation of the environment, which is determined through cultural practice, or by the introduction of a regulatory agent such as a predator or an insecticide. In regard to massive outbreaks, the use of insecticide is a primary method of tree protection.

==== Pesticide ====
In New Brunswick, over 3,600,000 hectares were sprayed at least once between 1952 and 1967. Most of the sprayed forests were still "in good condition" in 1968. Although a scattering of dead trees occurred throughout the region, in no case did mortality destroy a major operating unit or disrupt a long-term management plan. In contrast, mortality exceeded 65% in 2 unsprayed check areas, each 155 km^{2}. If the program of spraying against budworm had not been carried out, forest production in central New Brunswick is estimated to have been reduced to 20% of its normal production.

==== Biological control ====
Chemical controls are controversial because they only provide short-term protection and require multiple applications. As a result, research has been done on alternative biological controls using natural predators. A 1989 study found that woodland birds cannot effectively control the damage caused by budworms during outbreaks because their food requirements are exceeded. However, birds are important in controlling budworms and lessening damage caused by defoliation when budworm populations are less than outbreak levels.

Inundated releases of Trichogramma minutum Ril., a species of parasitic wasp, have also been investigated for use as a biological control of Choristoneura fumiferana. Levels of egg parasitism were strongly affected by factors such as time of release, parasite density, and local weather. Some other factors that were less significant included the food supply of adult female parasites, elevation of the host egg-mass, host density, and the intensity of solar radiation. Temperature and host egg differences also influenced the biological characteristics of reared parasites, which could possibly affect the success of field releases. Due to the high degree of individual variation within each strain, rearing conditions were considered more important than the type of geographical strain of T. minutim utilized. The tree species on which the spruce budworm egg masses were laid did not influence the level of parasitism.

==== Pheromone traps ====
Pheromone traps may be used to watch C. fumiferana populations within forests in order to anticipate outbreaks. These traps release a synthesized pheromone that attracts male moths but previously used virgin females as a lure. This method of control has been utilized for over 20 years in some forests throughout Canada.
