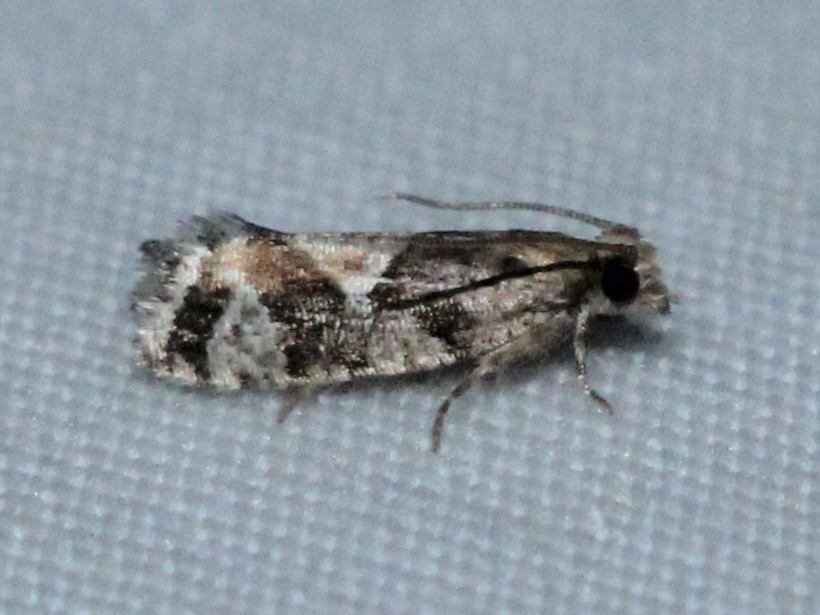

Scientific classification
- Domain: Eukaryota
- Kingdom: Animalia
- Phylum: Arthropoda
- Class: Insecta
- Order: Lepidoptera
- Family: Tortricidae
- Genus: Zeiraphera
- Species: Z. canadensis

Binomial name
- Zeiraphera canadensis Mutuura & Freeman, 1967

= Zeiraphera canadensis =

Species of moth

Zeiraphera canadensis, the spruce bud moth, is a moth of the family Tortricidae. It is a small brown moth mainly found in North America, specifically New Brunswick, Quebec, and the north-eastern United States. The adult moth flutters quickly, and stays low among trees during the day and higher above tree cover after sunset. The spruce bud moth relies primarily on the white spruce tree as a host plant. Both male and female spruce bud moths mate multiply, however males have the ability to secrete accessory gland proteins that prevent female re-mating. The moth is univoltine, meaning only one generation hatches per year, and its eggs overwinter from July to May. The species Z. ratzeburgiana is very similar to Z. canadensis and can only be distinguished by the presence of an anal comb in Z. canadensis.

In 1980, the moth was named a pest due to its effects on the white spruce tree’s growth. The spruce bud moth defoliates young white spruce trees, stunts tree growth, and deforms buds. Although the moth does not lead to spruce tree death, the deformation negatively affects the quality of wood harvested from spruce tree plantations. As a result, much research is being conducted into control methods for the spruce bud moth, including the use of sex pheromones in traps and annual pesticide sprays.

== Geographic range ==
The spruce bud moth is largely found in Canada, specifically New Brunswick and Quebec. The moth can also be found in other parts of North America and in the United States, particularly in the Northeast region, with high populations specifically found in Maine. The spruce bud moth is generally found in colder regions of the country, as their ovipositing and mating behaviors are highly temperature dependent.

== Habitat ==
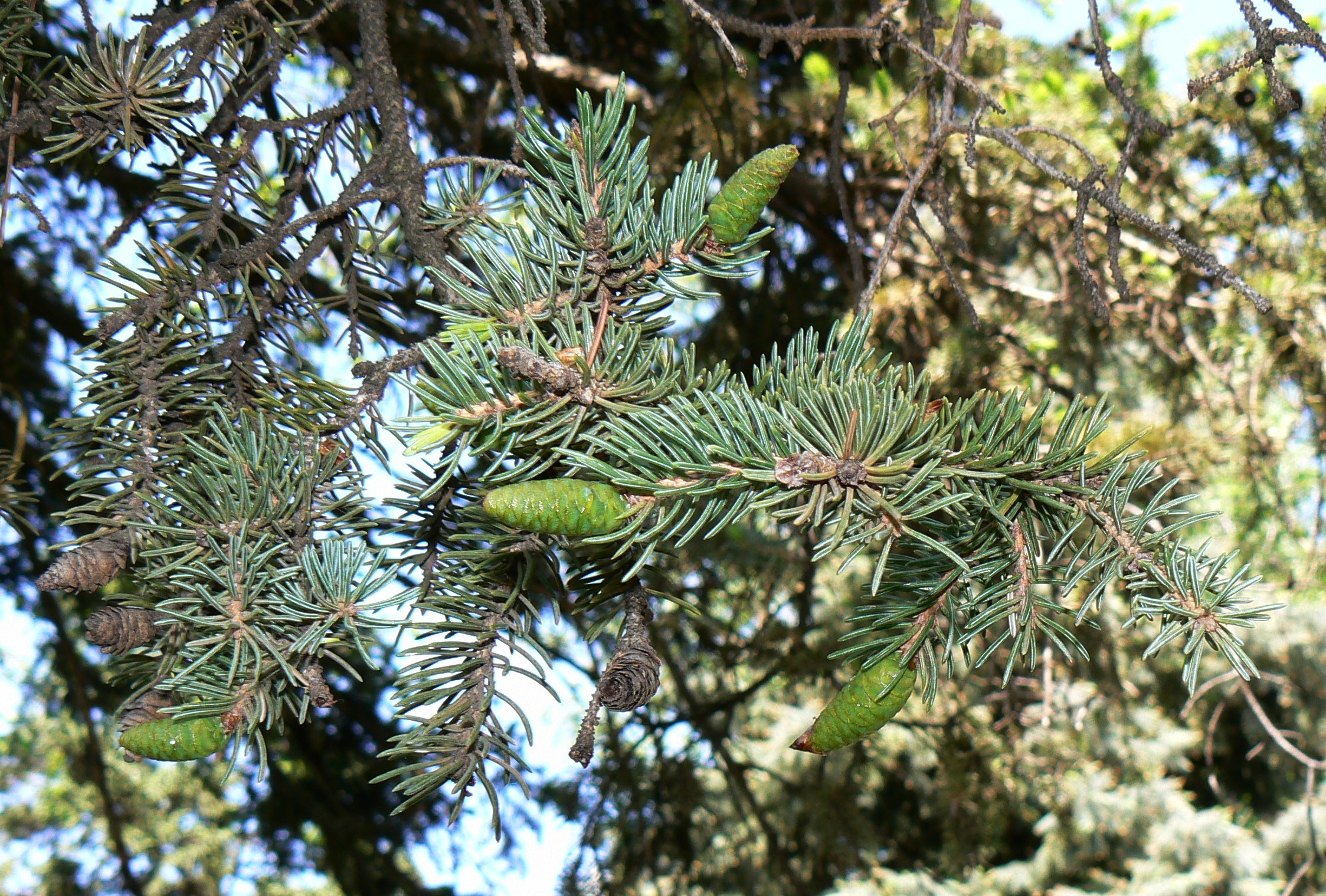
White spruce tree

The spruce bud moth is named for its host plant and main habitat, the white spruce. The moth, transcontinental in range, is found most frequently on white spruce and only occasionally on other spruces and firs. The larvae of the spruce bud moth hatch in the buds of white spruce trees. Much of its development, adult life, ovipositing and mating occurs on this tree, making it a key aspect of the moth’s life cycle and habitat. Consequently, the distribution of the moth is limited to regions with high density of white spruce trees, such as Canada and other Northern temperate regions.

== Life history ==
=== Egg ===
Female spruce bud moths oviposit on the un-burst buds of a white spruce tree. Females test out potential sites to oviposit using sensillae on their ovipositor, a receptor on their feet. Studies have shown that on average, females lay just over 30 eggs total in their lifetime, and that ovipositing occurs approximately 6–7 days after they emerge as adults.

The spruce bud moth hatches once a season, making it univoltine. The eggs are laid in July at the base of spruce shoots then hatch in May after overwintering. They are laid in clusters of up to 7 eggs.

=== Larva ===
The moth has four larval instars. Upon hatching, larvae at first remain within bursting spruce buds. The first and second instar larvae feed inside the needles of the spruce, while the third and fourth instar larvae eat spruce shoots. This destroys the cortical tissue, leading to weakening shoots, tree height loss, and destruction of the crown of the tree over time. Larvae feed on the needles and shoots for up to six weeks before dropping to the ground, spinning silk from ground materials, and cocooning to pupate. The age of the bud can affect the survival of Z. canadensis, with older buds negatively impacting size and survival.

=== Pupa ===
The larvae of the spruce bud moth pupate in the end of May. The entire process takes 10 days to complete. When larvae develop into prepupae, they fall from the spruce bud shoot onto the ground and stay in that stage for 6 days. The moth pupates on the ground with its littermates.

=== Adult ===
The adults begin mating within the first night post-eclosion to produce small clusters of up to 7 eggs. The moths are most active during periods of mating and ovipositioning. They fly higher, above the spruce trees, after daylight and during dusk and evening, and remain lower among the crown of the spruce trees during the day when the temperature is higher.

== Predators and parasites ==
=== Predators ===
Predators that feed on eggs typically predate unparasitized eggs, and predation begins up to 3 weeks after oviposition has occurred. Specific predators have not been identified.

=== Parasites ===
Spruce bud moths are parasitized by wasps of the genus Trichogramma, a family of parasitic wasp that use smell to identify eggs to parasitize. The wasp begins parasitizing 14 days following the start of the process of hatching of the larvae and continues for around a month afterward. Egg parasitism typically begins 5 weeks after oviposition occurs and does not have any connection with the egg density at oviposition.

== Mating ==
=== Female-male interactions ===
==== Pheromones ====
E-9-tetradecenyl-acetate is one of the sex pheromones that the spruce bud moth releases while mating, and was found to particularly attract male moths. This pheromone can be synthesized and is being used as a pest control method to trap spruce bud moths.

==== Copulation and number of mates ====
Spruce bud moths mate between 10 pm and 4 am. The male floats slightly above the female who is resting on a branch, and then pauses and remains still a short distance away from the female before copulating. This pause may encompass some form of communication between the male and female. Both males and females mate with multiple partners, making the species polygamous. However, males secrete accessory gland proteins alongside spermatophores that can prevent females from re-mating. The size of the male affects his ability inseminate, due to differential spermatophore sizes. Larger males are also better able to secrete accessory gland proteins.

== Physical appearance ==
Spruce bud moth larvae are approximately one centimeter in length. They begin as brown and by the time they reach the fourth-instar stage, they transition to a light yellow color. Adult spruce bud moths have dark wings and a wingspan of half an inch.

== Flight ==
The spruce bud moth has a rapid fluttering wing motion when flying. They typically fly low during the day and fly higher over the branches of the spruce tree after the sun has set and the temperature has dropped, as they mate after dark due to sensitivity to high temperatures.

== Interactions with humans ==
=== As pests ===
The spruce bud moth defoliates young white spruce trees, and after 1980, upon the plantation of extensive regions of white spruce, has been considered a pest. As mentioned, the larvae of the spruce bud moth, in particular, deform the buds of the spruce tree greatly, specifically destroying the cortical tissue and crown of the tree, weakening shoots, and causing tree height loss. Zeiraphera canadensis has caused a high incidence of multiple and abnormal leaders in white spruce in the Maritime provinces, Quebec, and Maine. However, although severe feeding damage has seldom been extensive in forests, new shoots on open-grown white spruce are frequently disfigured.

=== Control efforts ===
Extensive research into sex pheromones or sex attractants has been done to explore the possibility of using them in concordance with insect traps to prevent moths that are attempting to mate from reaching the spruce tree either to mate or to oviposit. Attempts to use Trichogramma wasps to parasitize and kill eggs before they hatch have been largely unsuccessful, so at present, suggestions for spruce bud moth control include spraying with pesticides at strategic intervals, including during late July when ovipositioning occurs and the following year in early May when the eggs hatch into larvae. Finally, there are nutritionally depleted white spruces that are resistant to harm by the spruce bud moth. A suggestion by researchers for controlling spruce damage by the moth is to plant resistant trees alongside non-resistant trees in order to potentially lower the overall effect of the moth on the spruce plantation.
