= Zeiraphera unfortunana =

Scientific classification
- Kingdom: Animalia
- Phylum: Arthropoda
- Clade: Pancrustacea
- Class: Insecta
- Order: Lepidoptera
- Family: Tortricidae
- Genus: Zeiraphera
- Species: Z. unfortunana

Binomial name
- Zeiraphera unfortunana Ferris & Kruse, 2008

Species of moth

Zeiraphera unfortunana, the purplestriped shootworm, is a moth of the family Tortricidae. It is found in North America in Nova Scotia, from Ontario to British Columbia, Yukon, Alaska, Michigan and Minnesota.

The larvae feed on Picea glauca, Picea engelmanni, Picea sitchensis, Abies balsamea, Abies lasiocarpa and Abies amabilis.
