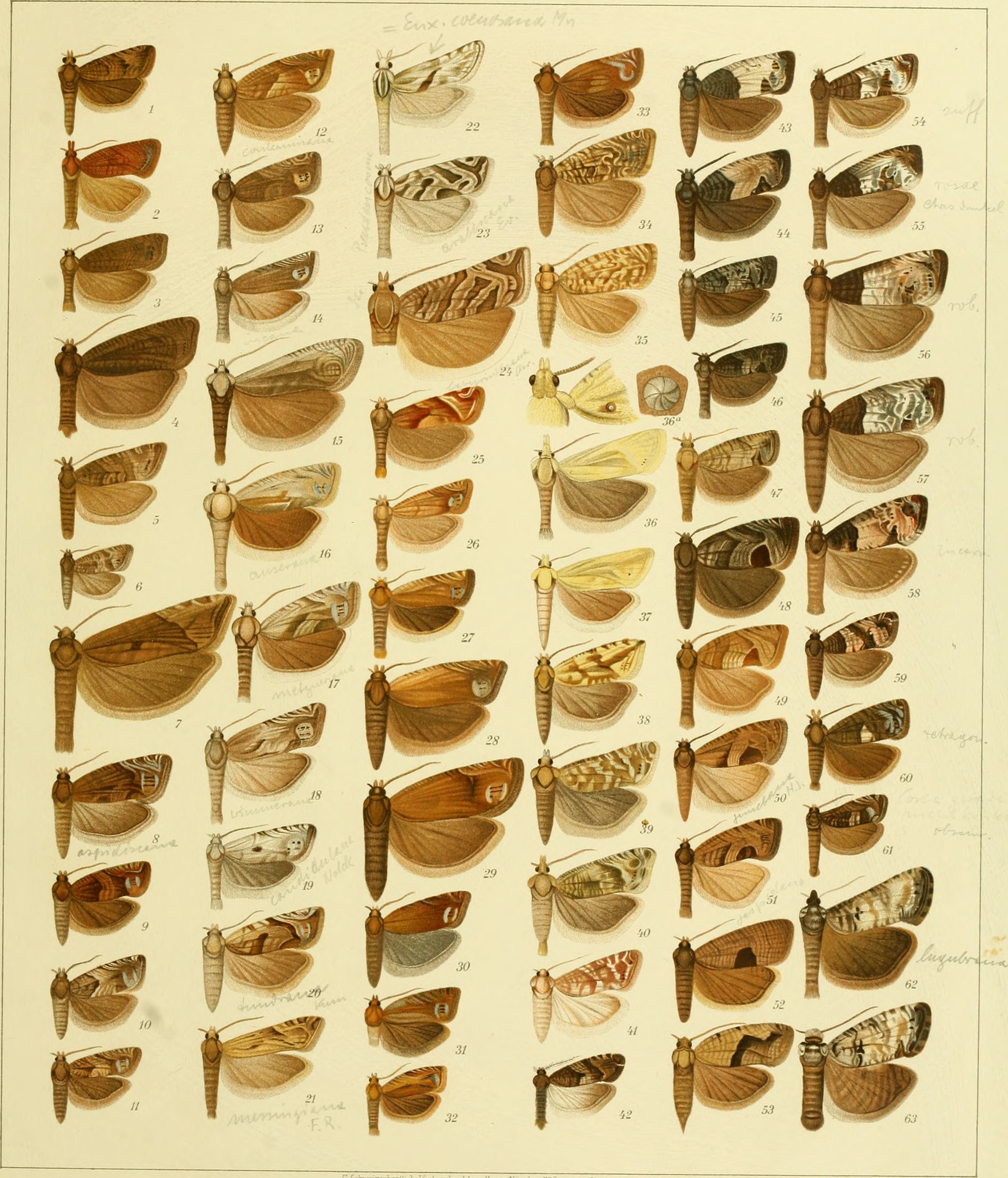
- Zeiraphera subcorticana in Kennel Die palaearktischen tortriciden figure 53

Scientific classification
- Kingdom: Animalia
- Phylum: Arthropoda
- Class: Insecta
- Order: Lepidoptera
- Family: Tortricidae
- Genus: Zeiraphera
- Species: Z. subcorticana

Binomial name
- Zeiraphera subcorticana (Snellen, 1883)

Synonyms
- Grapholitha (Paedisca) subcorticana Snellen, 1883; Steganoptycha imprimata Caradja, 1916; Steganoptycha imprimata var. lavata Caradja, 1916

= Zeiraphera subcorticana =

Species of moth

Zeiraphera subcorticana is a species of moth of the family Tortricidae. It is found in China (Jilin, Heilongjiang, Guizhou), Japan and Russia.

The wingspan is 15–17 mm.

The larvae feed on Acer species.
