= Zeiraphera thymelopa =

Scientific classification
- Kingdom: Animalia
- Phylum: Arthropoda
- Class: Insecta
- Order: Lepidoptera
- Family: Tortricidae
- Genus: Zeiraphera
- Species: Z. thymelopa

Binomial name
- Zeiraphera thymelopa (Meyrick, 1938)

Synonyms
- Argyroploce thymelopa Meyrick, 1938

Species of moth

Zeiraphera thymelopa is a species of moth of the family Tortricidae. It is found in China (Fujian, Tibet, Shaanxi, Gansu, Yunnan).
