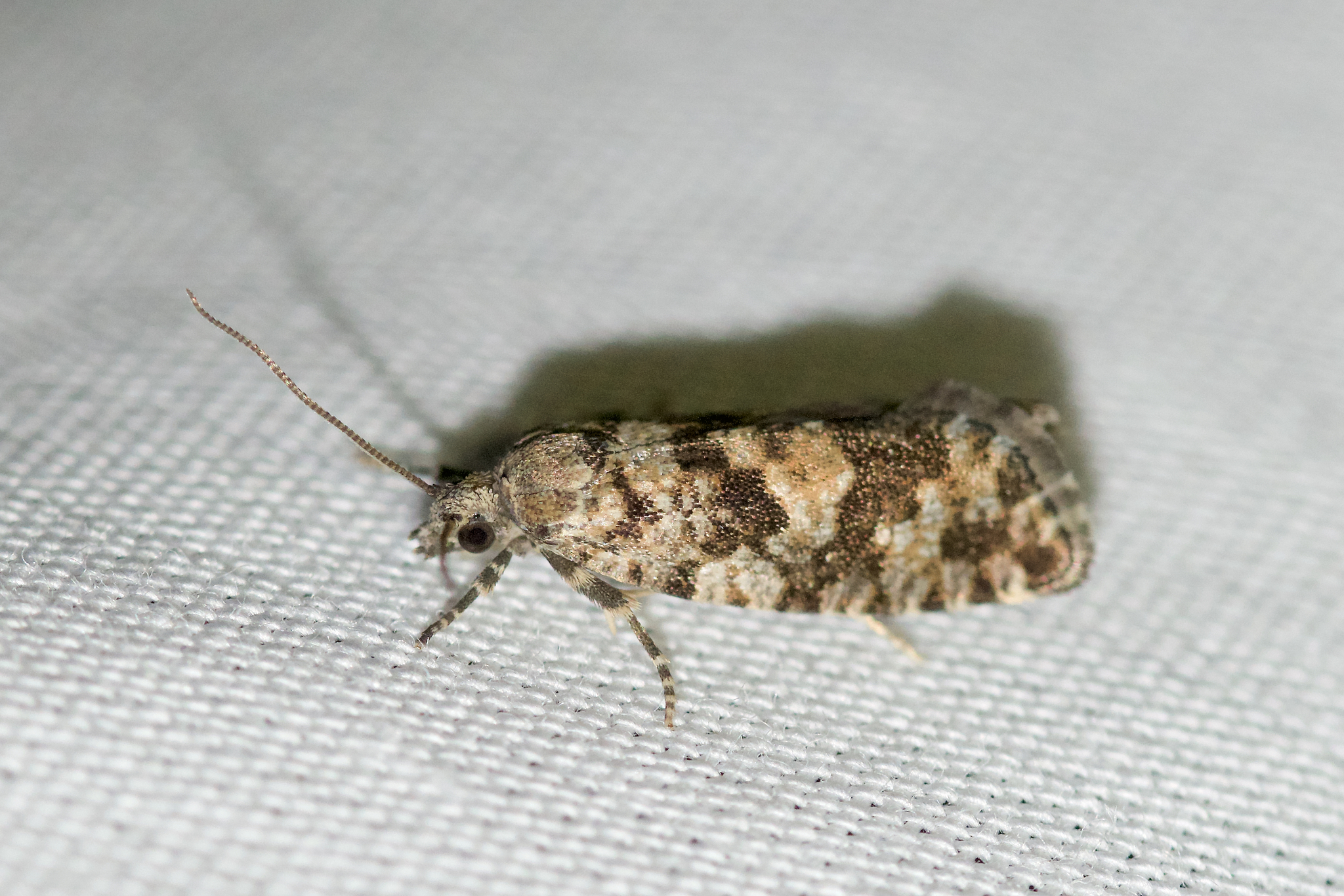

Scientific classification
- Kingdom: Animalia
- Phylum: Arthropoda
- Class: Insecta
- Order: Lepidoptera
- Family: Tortricidae
- Genus: Zeiraphera
- Species: Z. improbana

Binomial name
- Zeiraphera improbana Walker, 1863

Synonyms
- Zeiraphera diffiniana; Zeiraphera destitutana; Zeiraphera indivisana; Zeiraphera pseudotsugana

= Zeiraphera improbana =

Species of moth

Zeiraphera improbana, the larch needleworm moth, is a species of moth in the family Tortricidae. It is found in North America.

The wingspan is about 19 mm.

The larvae feed on Larix species.
