= Zeiraphera lariciana =

Scientific classification
- Kingdom: Animalia
- Phylum: Arthropoda
- Class: Insecta
- Order: Lepidoptera
- Family: Tortricidae
- Genus: Zeiraphera
- Species: Z. lariciana

Binomial name
- Zeiraphera lariciana Kawabe, 1980

Species of moth

Zeiraphera lariciana is a species of moth of the family Tortricidae. It is found in China (Hebei, Heilongjiang) and Japan.

The wingspan is 14–17 mm.

The larvae feed on Larix gmelini.
