= Zeiraphera fulvomixtana =

Scientific classification
- Kingdom: Animalia
- Phylum: Arthropoda
- Class: Insecta
- Order: Lepidoptera
- Family: Tortricidae
- Genus: Zeiraphera
- Species: Z. fulvomixtana

Binomial name
- Zeiraphera fulvomixtana Kawabe, 1974

Species of moth

Zeiraphera fulvomixtana is a species of moth of the family Tortricidae. It is found in Taiwan, Korea and Japan.

The wingspan is 15.5–19 mm.
