= Zeiraphera funesta =

Scientific classification
- Domain: Eukaryota
- Kingdom: Animalia
- Phylum: Arthropoda
- Class: Insecta
- Order: Lepidoptera
- Family: Tortricidae
- Genus: Zeiraphera
- Species: Z. funesta

Binomial name
- Zeiraphera funesta (Filipjev, 1931)

Synonyms
- Semasia (Steganoptycha) funesta Filipjev, 1931

Species of moth

Zeiraphera funesta is a species of moth of the family Tortricidae. It is found in China (north-east and Guizhou) and Russia.

The larvae feed on Malus mandshurica, Malus pallasiana, Pyrus ussuriensis and Armeniaca sibirica.
