= Zeiraphera taiwana =

Scientific classification
- Kingdom: Animalia
- Phylum: Arthropoda
- Class: Insecta
- Order: Lepidoptera
- Family: Tortricidae
- Genus: Zeiraphera
- Species: Z. taiwana

Binomial name
- Zeiraphera taiwana Kawabe, 1986

Species of moth

Zeiraphera taiwana is a species of moth of the family Tortricidae. It is found in Taiwan.
