= Zeiraphera rufimitrana =

Scientific classification
- Kingdom: Animalia
- Phylum: Arthropoda
- Class: Insecta
- Order: Lepidoptera
- Family: Tortricidae
- Genus: Zeiraphera
- Species: Z. rufimitrana

Binomial name
- Zeiraphera rufimitrana (Herrich-Schäffer, 1851)

Synonyms
- Tortrix (Coccyx) rufimitrana Herrich-Schäffer, 1851; Zeiraphera truncata Oku, 1968

Species of moth

Zeiraphera rufimitrana, the red-headed fir tortricid, is a moth of the family Tortricidae. It is found from central Europe to eastern Russia, Mongolia, the Korean Peninsula, China (Jilin, Heilongjiang) and Japan. It was first recorded from the Netherlands by Kuchlein and Naves in 1999.

The wingspan is 12–16 mm. Adults are on wing from the end of June to August.

The larvae of ssp. truncata feed on Abies sachalinensis. Larvae of the nominate subspecies feed on Abies alba, Abies cephalonica, Abies balsamea, Pinus pinea and Picea excelsa.

== Subspecies ==
- Zeiraphera rufimitrana rufimitrana
- Zeiraphera rufimitrana truncata Oku, 1968 (Japan)
