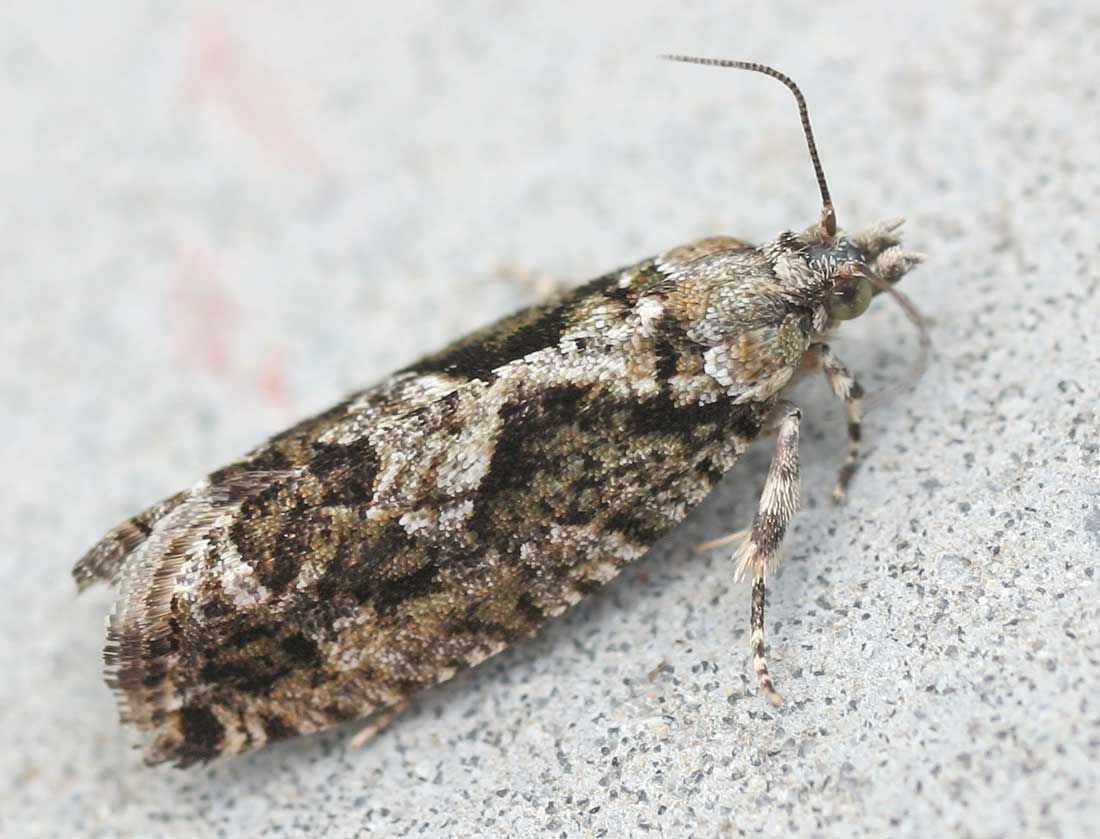

Scientific classification
- Domain: Eukaryota
- Kingdom: Animalia
- Phylum: Arthropoda
- Class: Insecta
- Order: Lepidoptera
- Family: Tortricidae
- Genus: Zeiraphera
- Species: Z. isertana

Binomial name
- Zeiraphera isertana (Fabricius, 1794)

Synonyms
- Pyralis isertana Fabricius, 1794; Tortrix adustana Hubner, [1811-1813]; Pyralis communana Fabricius, 1794; Tortrix corticana Hubner, [1811-1813]; Pyralis cuiviana Fabricius, 1794; Epinotia kuhlweiniana Hubner, [1825] 1816; Zeiraphera licheana Treitschke, 1829; Steganoptycha corticana var. nigricans Sorhagen, 1882; Steganoptycha corticana var. steiniana Sorhagen, 1882; Eucosma isertana f. wautersi Dufrane, 1955

= Zeiraphera isertana =

Species of moth

Zeiraphera isertana is a moth of the family Tortricidae. It is found in China (Liaoning, Gansu, Qinghai), Russia, Europe and the Near East.

The wingspan is 13–18 mm. The moth flies from July to August in western Europe.

The larvae feed on the leaves of Quercus, Pyrus and Ulmus species.
