= Zeiraphera corpulentana =

Scientific classification
- Domain: Eukaryota
- Kingdom: Animalia
- Phylum: Arthropoda
- Class: Insecta
- Order: Lepidoptera
- Family: Tortricidae
- Genus: Zeiraphera
- Species: Z. corpulentana

Binomial name
- Zeiraphera corpulentana (Kennel, 1901)

Synonyms
- Steganoptycha corpulentana Kennel, 1901

Species of moth

Zeiraphera corpulentana is a species of moth of the family Tortricidae. It is found in China (Beijing, Jilin, Heilongjiang, Anhui), Korea, Japan and Russia.

The wingspan is 17–21 mm.

The larvae feed on Syringa amurensis and Leptodermis potaninii.
