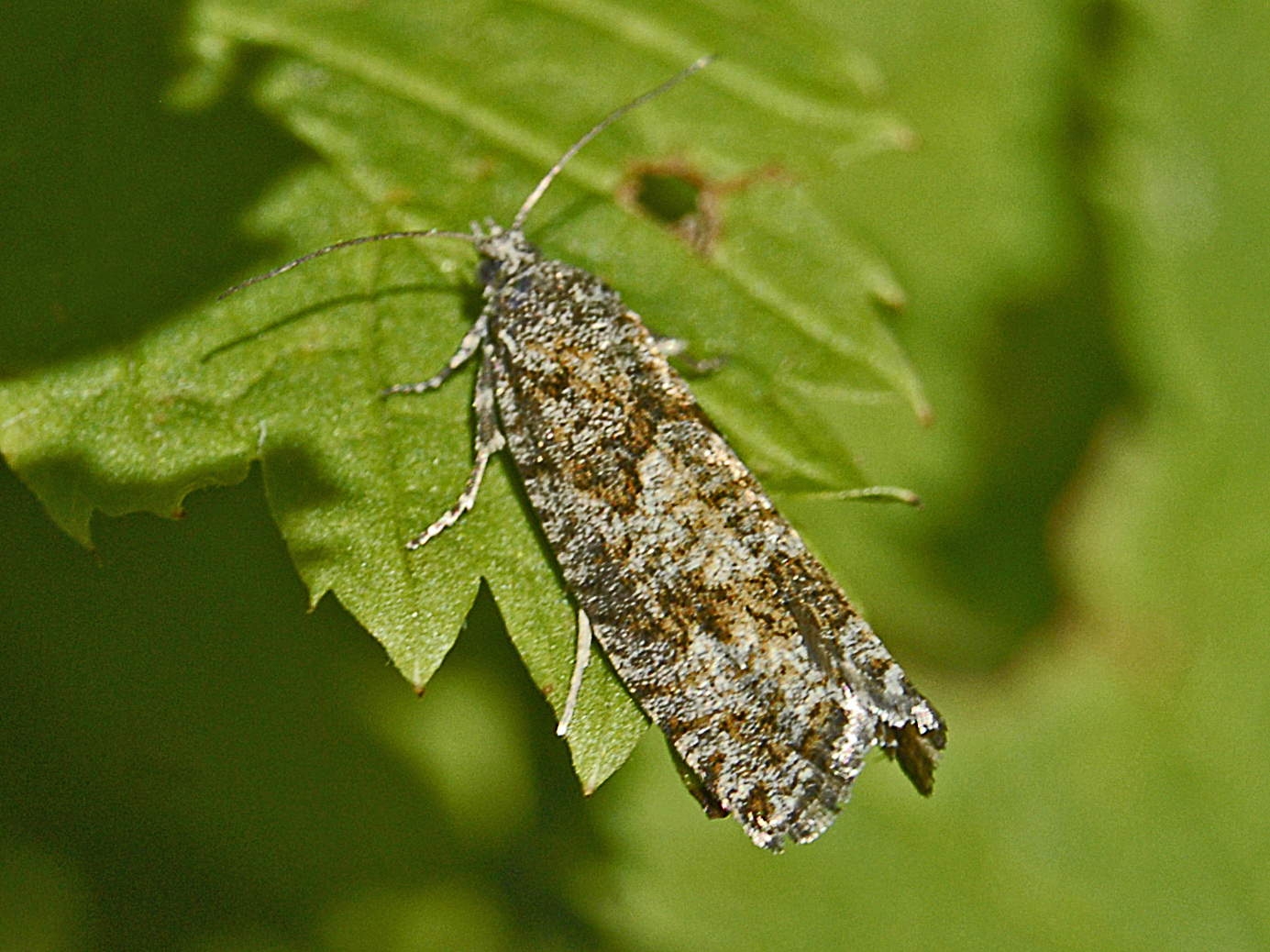

Scientific classification
- Kingdom: Animalia
- Phylum: Arthropoda
- Clade: Pancrustacea
- Class: Insecta
- Order: Lepidoptera
- Family: Tortricidae
- Genus: Zeiraphera
- Species: Z. griseana

Binomial name
- Zeiraphera griseana (Hübner, 1799)

Synonyms
- Zeiraphera diniana; Tortrix griseana Hubner, [1796-1799]; Steganoptycha diniana var. desertana Caradja, 1916; Sphaleroptera diniana Guenee, 1845; Poecilochroma occultana Douglas, 1846; Grapholitha pinicolana Lienig & Zeller, 1846

= Zeiraphera griseana =

Species of moth

The Zeiraphera griseana, the larch tortrix, is a moth of the family Tortricidae.

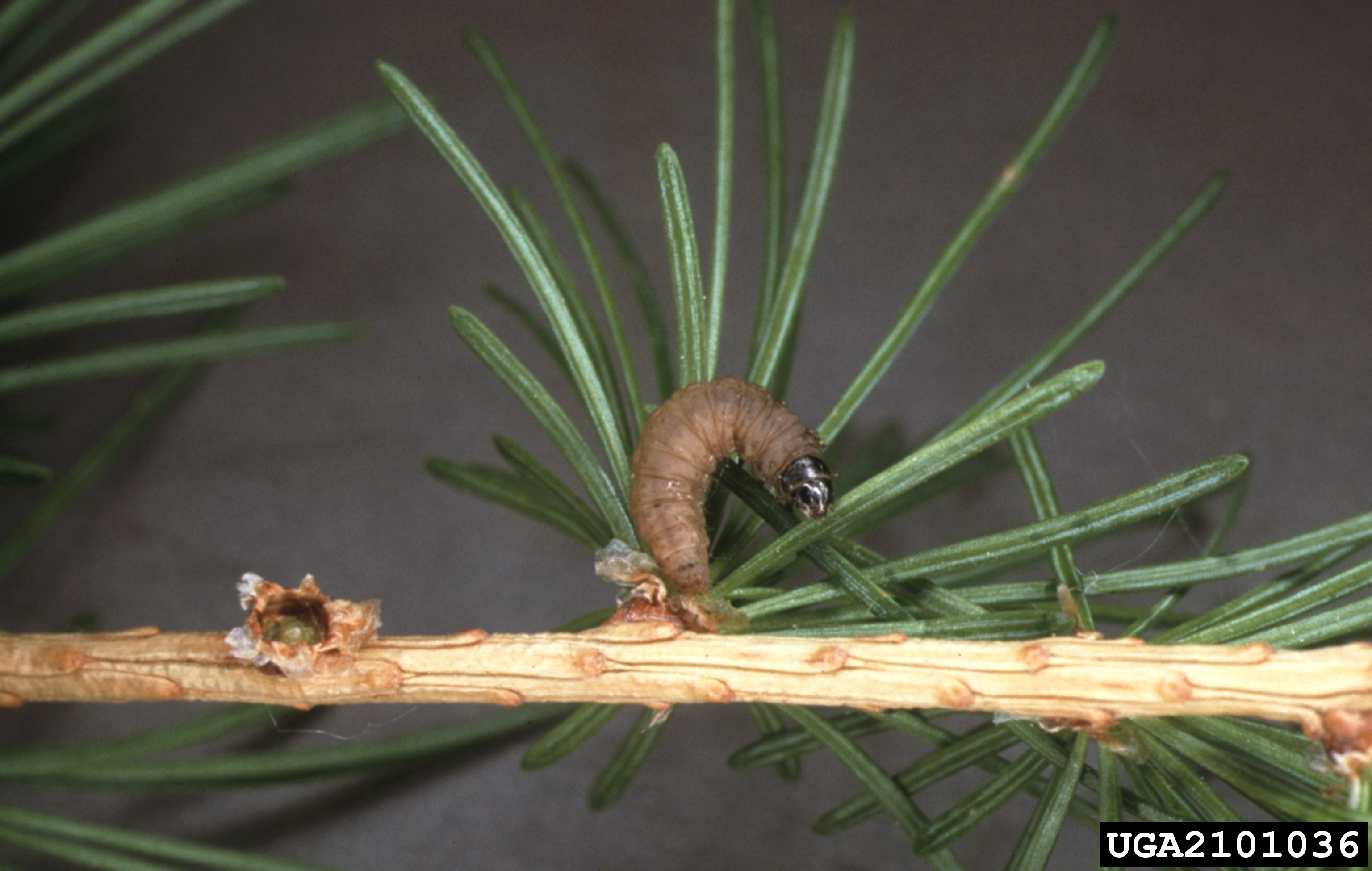
Caterpillar of Zeiraphera griseana on European larch (Larix decidua

== Description ==
The wingspan is 16–22 mm. The long, narrow forewings are greyish brown, lightly speckled with whitish. The brown-gray hindwings are broader than the forewings.

== Biology ==
Zeiraphera griseana is a single-brooded species. Adults are on wing in July depending on the location. Larvae live inside a tube-like spinning among the leaves. They feed on the needles of Larix species (Larix gmelini and Larix decidua), Picea asperata, Abies fabri, Pinus sylvestris and Pinus cembra.

== Distribution ==
This species is present in Europe, China (Hebei, Inner Mongolia, Jilin, Shaanxi, Gansu, Xinjiang), Korea, Japan, Russia and North America.

== Bibliography ==
- Friedrich-Karl Holtmeier: Tier in der Landschaft - Einfluss und ökologische Bedeutung. Ulmer Verlag, Stuttgart 2002, ISBN 3-8001-2783-0
