= Zeiraphera demutata =

Scientific classification
- Domain: Eukaryota
- Kingdom: Animalia
- Phylum: Arthropoda
- Class: Insecta
- Order: Lepidoptera
- Family: Tortricidae
- Genus: Zeiraphera
- Species: Z. demutata

Binomial name
- Zeiraphera demutata (Walsingham, 1900)

Synonyms
- Crocidosema demutata Walsingham, 1900

Species of moth

Zeiraphera demutata is a species of moth of the family Tortricidae. It is found in China (Jilin, Heilongjiang, Henan, Shaanxi, Gansu), Korea, Japan and Russia.

The wingspan is 17–20 mm.

The larvae feed on Quercus mongolica.
