= Zeiraphera bicolora =

Scientific classification
- Kingdom: Animalia
- Phylum: Arthropoda
- Class: Insecta
- Order: Lepidoptera
- Family: Tortricidae
- Genus: Zeiraphera
- Species: Z. bicolora

Binomial name
- Zeiraphera bicolora Kawabe, 1976

Species of moth

Zeiraphera bicolora is a species of moth of the family Tortricidae. It is found in China (Jilin, Sichuan, Gansu), Japan and Russia.
