= Zeiraphera virinea =

Scientific classification
- Domain: Eukaryota
- Kingdom: Animalia
- Phylum: Arthropoda
- Class: Insecta
- Order: Lepidoptera
- Family: Tortricidae
- Genus: Zeiraphera
- Species: Z. virinea

Binomial name
- Zeiraphera virinea Falkovitsh, 1965

Species of moth

Zeiraphera virinea is a species of moth of the family Tortricidae. It is found in China (Jilin, Henan, Hunan, Sichuan, Guizhou), Korea, Japan and Russia.

The wingspan is 15–19 mm.

The larvae feed on Viburnum sargentii.
