= Zeiraphera atra =

Scientific classification
- Domain: Eukaryota
- Kingdom: Animalia
- Phylum: Arthropoda
- Class: Insecta
- Order: Lepidoptera
- Family: Tortricidae
- Genus: Zeiraphera
- Species: Z. atra

Binomial name
- Zeiraphera atra Falkovitsh, 1965

Species of moth

Zeiraphera atra is a species of moth of the family Tortricidae. It is found in China (Shanxi), Korea and the Russian Far East.
