= Zeiraphera gansuensis =

Scientific classification
- Domain: Eukaryota
- Kingdom: Animalia
- Phylum: Arthropoda
- Class: Insecta
- Order: Lepidoptera
- Family: Tortricidae
- Genus: Zeiraphera
- Species: Z. gansuensis

Binomial name
- Zeiraphera gansuensis Liu & Nasu, 1993

Species of moth

Zeiraphera gansuensis is a species of moth of the family Tortricidae. It is found in China (Inner Mongolia, Shaanxi, Gansu, Qinghai).

The larvae feed on Pinus tabulaeformis.
