= Zeiraphera hiroshii =

Scientific classification
- Kingdom: Animalia
- Phylum: Arthropoda
- Class: Insecta
- Order: Lepidoptera
- Family: Tortricidae
- Genus: Zeiraphera
- Species: Z. hiroshii

Binomial name
- Zeiraphera hiroshii Kawabe, 1980

Species of moth

Zeiraphera hiroshii is a species of moth of the family Tortricidae. It is found in China (Sichuan, Guizhou) and Japan.

The wingspan is 16.5–18 mm.
