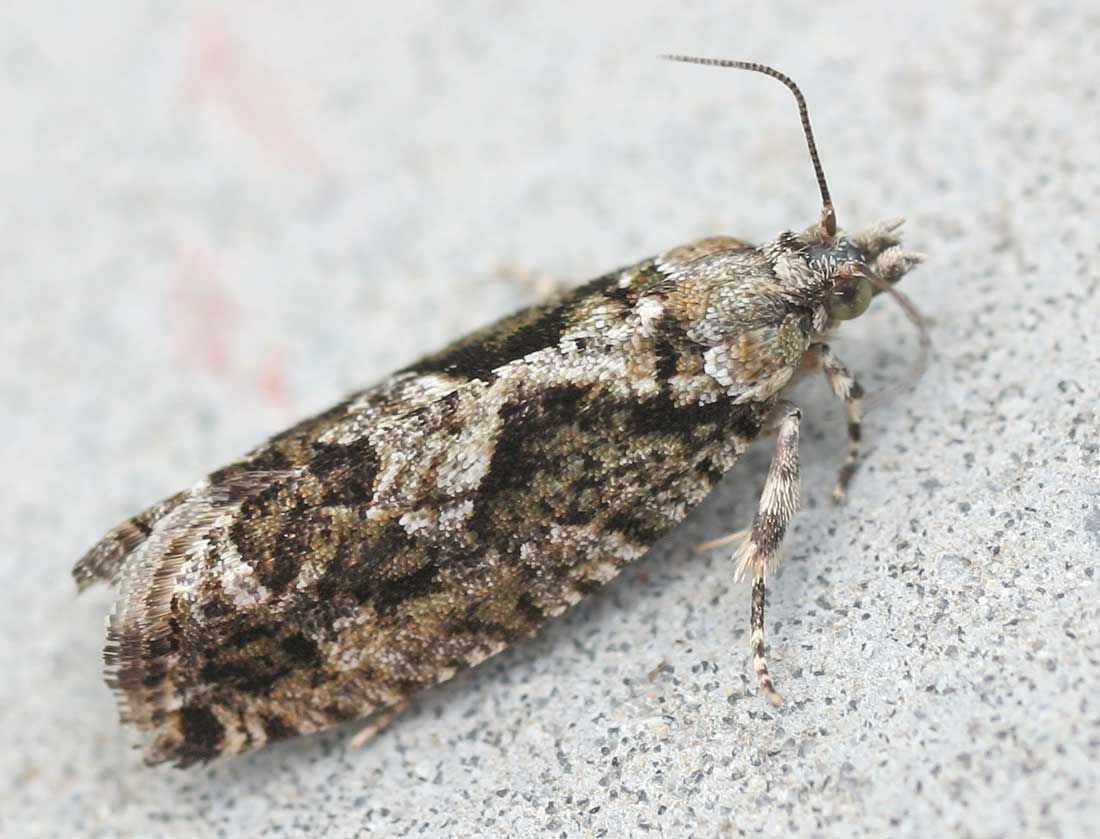
- Zeiraphera isertana

Scientific classification
- Domain: Eukaryota
- Kingdom: Animalia
- Phylum: Arthropoda
- Class: Insecta
- Order: Lepidoptera
- Family: Tortricidae
- Tribe: Eucosmini
- Genus: Zeiraphera; Treitschke, 1829

= Zeiraphera =

Genus of tortrix moths

Zeiraphera is a genus of moths belonging to the subfamily Olethreutinae of the family Tortricidae.

== Species ==
- Zeiraphera argutana (Christoph, 1881)
- Zeiraphera atra Falkovitsh, 1965
- Zeiraphera bicolora Kawabe, 1976
- Zeiraphera caeruleumana Kawabe, 1980
- Zeiraphera canadensis Mutuura & Freeman, 1967
- Zeiraphera claypoleana (Riley, 1882)
- Zeiraphera corpulentana (Kennel, 1901)
- Zeiraphera demutata (Walsingham, 1900)
- Zeiraphera fortunana (Kearfott, 1907)
- Zeiraphera fulvomixtana Kawabe, 1974
- Zeiraphera funesta (Filipjev, 1931)
- Zeiraphera gansuensis Liu & Bae, 1994
- Zeiraphera griseana (Hübner, [1796-1799])
- Zeiraphera hesperiana Mutuura & Freeman, 1967
- Zeiraphera hiroshii Kawabe, 1980
- Zeiraphera hohuanshana Kawabe, 1986
- Zeiraphera improbana (Walker, 1863)
- Zeiraphera isertana (Fabricius, 1794)
- Zeiraphera lariciana Kawabe, 1980
- Zeiraphera luciferana Kawabe, 1980
- Zeiraphera nigra Kawabe, 1995
- Zeiraphera pacifica Freeman, 1966
- Zeiraphera ratzeburgiana (Saxesen, in Ratzeburg, 1840)
- Zeiraphera rufimitrana (Herrich-Schaffer, 1851)
- Zeiraphera shimekii Kawabe, 1974
- Zeiraphera smaragdina Razowski, 1963
- Zeiraphera subcorticana (Snellen, 1883)
- Zeiraphera suzukii Oku, 1968
- Zeiraphera taiwana Kawabe, 1986
- Zeiraphera thymelopa (Meyrick in Caradja & Meyrick, 1938)
- Zeiraphera unfortunana Powell, 1983
- Zeiraphera vancouverana McDunnough, 1925
- Zeiraphera virinea Falkovitsh, 1965

== See also ==
- List of Tortricidae genera
