= Zeiraphera hohuanshana =

Scientific classification
- Kingdom: Animalia
- Phylum: Arthropoda
- Class: Insecta
- Order: Lepidoptera
- Family: Tortricidae
- Genus: Zeiraphera
- Species: Z. hohuanshana

Binomial name
- Zeiraphera hohuanshana Kawabe, 1986

Species of moth

Zeiraphera hohuanshana is a species of moth of the family Tortricidae. It is found in Taiwan.
