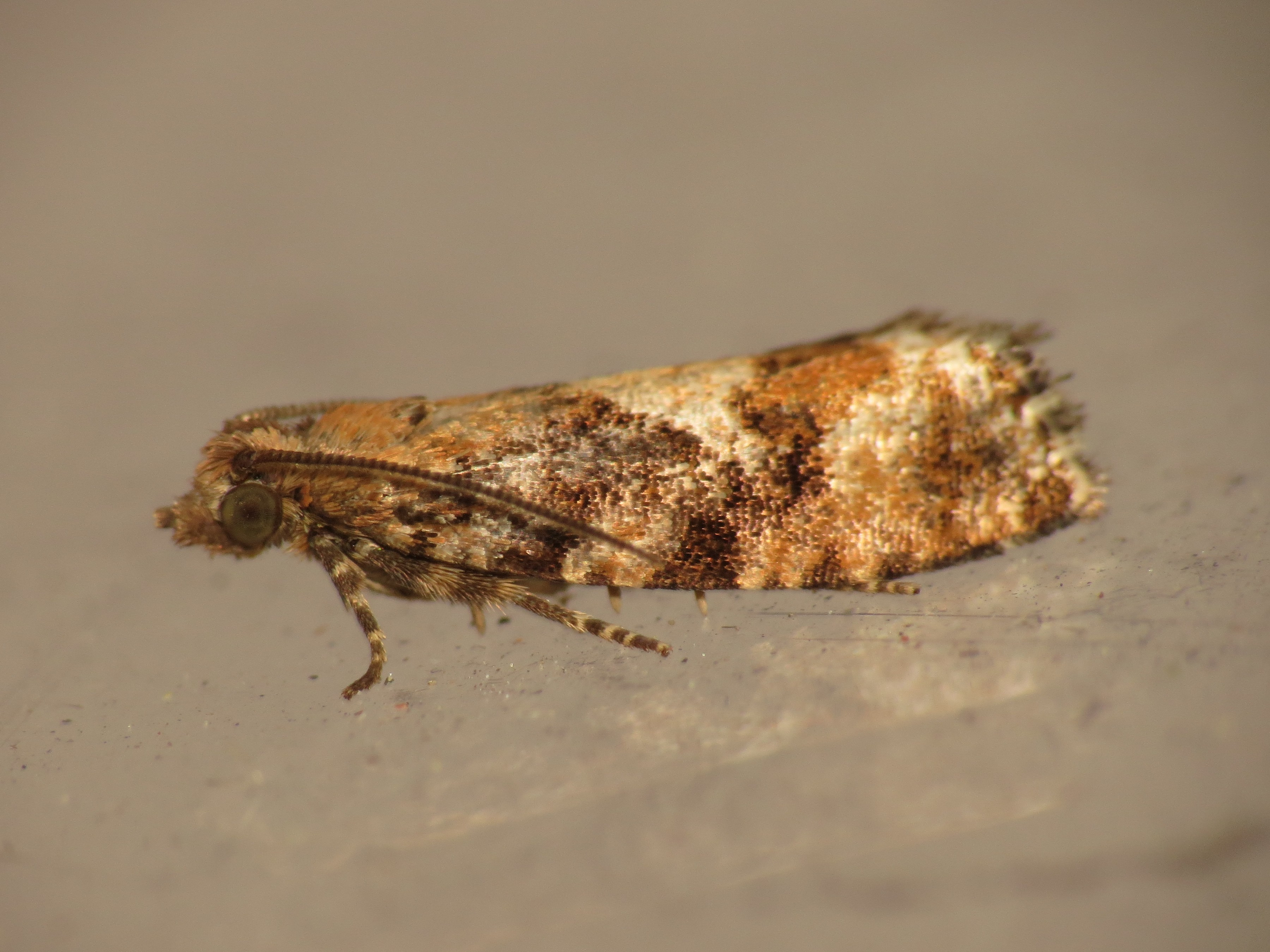

Scientific classification
- Domain: Eukaryota
- Kingdom: Animalia
- Phylum: Arthropoda
- Class: Insecta
- Order: Lepidoptera
- Family: Tortricidae
- Genus: Zeiraphera
- Species: Z. ratzeburgiana

Binomial name
- Zeiraphera ratzeburgiana (Saxesen in Ratzeburg, 1840)

Synonyms
- Phalaena Tortrix Coccyx ratzeburgiana Saxesen in Ratzeburg, 1840; Sericoris abietisana Freyer, 1842; Zeiraphera bimaculana Schlger, 1848; Grapholitha binotana Wocke, 1861; Grapholitha binotatana Heinemann, 1863; Sericoris errana Guenee, 1845; Semasia (Zeiraphera) paludiphila Toll, 1957

= Zeiraphera ratzeburgiana =

Species of moth

Zeiraphera ratzeburgiana, the spruce bud moth or Ratzeburg tortricid, is a moth of the family Tortricidae. It is found from northern and central Europe to eastern Russia and China (Gansu, Qinghai). Zeiraphera ratzeburgiana is a taxonomically similar species to Zeiraphera canadensis and can only be distinguished by an anal comb found in Z. canadensis.

The wingspan is 12–15 mm. Adults are on wing in July and August.

The larvae mainly feed on Picea abies, but has also been recorded on Picea sitchensis, Picea smithiana, Pinus sylvestris, Pinus pinea and Abies cephalonica.
