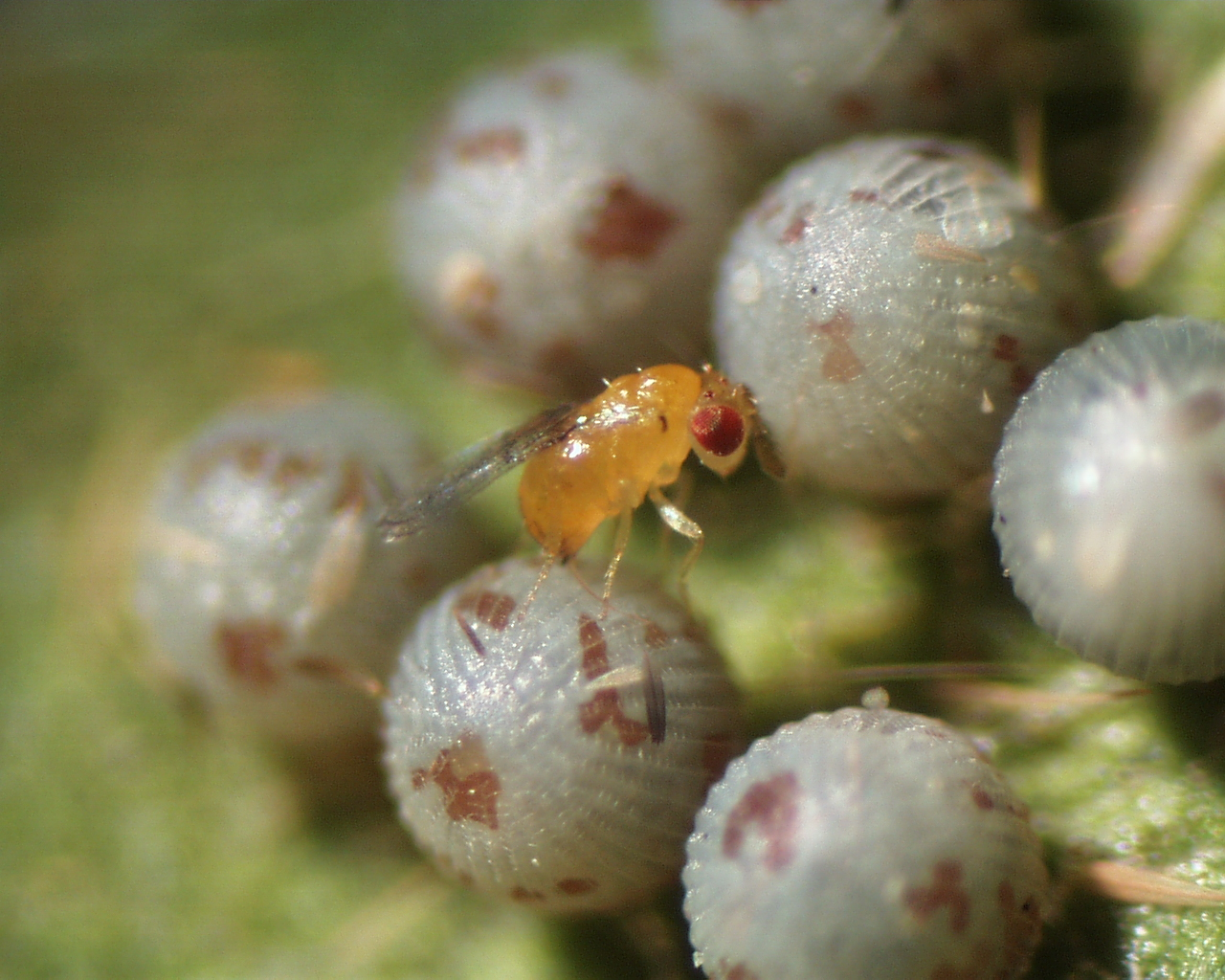
- Female Trichogramma dendrolimi on egg of armyworm (Noctuidae)

Scientific classification
- Kingdom: Animalia
- Phylum: Arthropoda
- Clade: Pancrustacea
- Class: Insecta
- Order: Hymenoptera
- Family: Trichogrammatidae
- Subfamily: Trichogrammatinae
- Tribe: Trichogrammatini
- Genus: Trichogramma; Westwood, 1833

Species
- 230+, see text

= Trichogramma =

Genus of parasitic insects

Trichogramma is a genus of minute polyphagous wasps that are endoparasitoids of insect eggs. Trichogramma is one of around 80 genera from the family Trichogrammatidae, with over 200 species worldwide.

Although several groups of egg parasitoids are commonly employed for biological control throughout the world, Trichogramma spp. have been the most extensively studied. More than a thousand papers have been published on Trichogramma species, and they are the most used biological control agents in the world.

Trichogramma spp. are also of interest in neuroscience research, having fewer than 10,000 neurons, approaching the theoretical lower limit of the size of an insect brain, yet exhibiting complex behaviors to sustain their lives.

== Sensation ==
Trichogramma have highly developed chemosensory organs due to their need to discriminate host from nonhost in a crowded environment. Zhang et al. 1979 finds 13 sensilla types on the antennae, eyes, mouthparts, wing, leg, and external genitalia of T. dendrolimi. This is considered to generalize to the entire genus, and there may be more still undiscovered.

== Parasitism ==
To locate host eggs, adult females use chemical and visual signals, such as egg shape and colour. After she finds a suitable egg, an experienced female attempts to determine if the egg has previously been parasitized, using her ovipositor and antennal drumming (tapping on the egg surface). Females also use antennal drumming to determine the size and quality of the target egg, which determines the number of eggs the female will insert. A single female can parasitize up to 10 host eggs a day.

== Identification ==
Trichogramma wasps are small and very uniform in structure, which causes difficulty in identifying the separate species. As females are all relatively similar, taxonomists rely upon examination of males to tell the different species apart, using features of their antennae and genitalia.

The first description of a Trichogramma species was in North America in 1871, by Charles V. Riley. He described the tiny wasps that emerged from eggs of the viceroy butterfly as Trichogramma minutum. In taxonomy, original specimens are very important, as they are the basis of reference for subsequent descriptions of species. The original specimens, however, were lost. Riley also described a second species in 1879 as Trichogramma pretiosum, but these specimens were also lost. To correct these errors, entomologists returned to the areas where Riley originally found the species and obtained neotype specimens of T. minutum and T. pretiosum. These specimens are now preserved properly in the United States National Museum. Currently, the number of Trichogramma species is over 200, but as of 1960, only some 40 species of Trichogramma had been described.

== Wolbachia in Trichogramma ==
Wolbachia is a widespread bacterial genus that infects insects' organs, most commonly the reproductive organs. Wolbachia has been observed to alter the host's reproductive success upon infection. Through a series of manipulations, Wolbachia-infected hosts transmit this intracellular bacterium to uninfected individuals. These manipulations include male killing (increasing ratio of infected females that can reproduce), feminization (males become fertile females), parthenogenesis, and cytoplasmic incompatibility. Horizontal transfer of parthenogenesis-inducing Wolbachia, which has been observed in Trichogramma wasps, causes infected females to asexually produce fertile females and nonfunctional males. The effects of this include potential speciation of Trichogramma, if Wolbachia is maintained long enough for genetic divergence to occur and for a new species of asexual wasps to become reproductively isolated.

Transmission of the bacterium through horizontal transfer has been observed within the same species and among different species of Trichogramma, including T. kaykai, T. deion, T. pretiosum, and T. atopovirilia; however, limitations to transmission exist. In vitro successful horizontal transfer is uncommon within Trichogramma, which suggests that the density of Wolbachia must be relatively high inside of the hosts' ovaries. Cytoplasmic incompatibility of the host and bacterium can also be the source of this unsuccessful transfer in-vitro. These limitations in vitro suggest that in nature, horizontal transfer by parthenogenesis-inducing Wolbachia may be a difficult and rare phenomenon. However, when looking at the Wolbachia-host associations, the Trichogramma-Wolbachia form a monophyletic group based on several Wolbachia-specific genes, which may be explained by horizontal transfer of Wolbachia between different species. Therefore, although interspecific horizontal transfer of Wolbachia is limited in vitro, it is likely to occur quite frequently in nature and is not well understood yet.

The effects of Wolbachia in Trichogramma have several evolutionary implications. Commonly, uninfected wasps are unable to breed with infected wasps. Many generations of reproductive isolation of these different groups may result in speciation. In addition, some hosts can evolve with a dependency on Wolbachia for core reproductive functions, such as oogenesis, so that eventually an infection is a requirement for successful reproduction. Finally, Wolbachia can influence gender determination in its hosts so that more females are successfully born. This results in a reversal in sexual selection, where females must compete for male mates, which has evolutionary implications as it exposes different phenotypes to natural selection.

== Biological control ==
Trichogramma spp. have been used for control of lepidopteran pests for many years. They can be considered the Drosophila of the parasitoid world, as they have been used for inundative releases and much understanding today comes from experiments with these wasps.

Entomologists in the early 1900s began to rear Trichogramma spp. for biological control. T. minutum is one of the most commonly found species in Europe and was first mass reared in 1926 on eggs of Sitotroga cerealella. T. minutum has been investigated as a method of biological control of the Choristoneura fumiferana, a major pest of spruce and fir forests.

Nine species of Trichogramma are produced commercially in insectaries around the world, with 30 countries releasing them. Trichogramma wasps are used for control on numerous crops and plants; these include cotton, sugarcane, vegetables, sugarbeets, orchards, and forests. Some of the pests controlled include cotton bollworm (Helicoverpa armigera), codling moth (Cydia pomonella), lightbrown apple moth (Epiphyas postvittana), and European corn borer (Ostrinia nubilalis).

Trichogramma species vary in their host specificity. This can lead to nontarget hosts being parasitized. This, in turn, can cause problems by reducing the amount of parasitism of the target host, and depending on the rate of parasitism, nontarget effects could be significant on nontarget host populations. Research is being done on the use of Trichogramma wasps to control populations of spruce bud moth (Zeiraphera canadensis), which damages white spruce trees.

Trichogramma began to be seriously used in the 1990s in China. Since then some applications have fallen out of use due to the rise of Bt crops because Bt is also toxic to the parasitoid. Future expansion of Bt in China is expected, and this threatens some uses of Trichogramma, however for some crops/pests it remains the better option and so is expected to continue instead of expanded Bt in those applications. Trichogramma will be especially necessary for resistance management if Bt maize/Bt corn is widely adopted.

In 2021 the National Trust in England embarked on a trial of using T. evanescens, which parasitises clothes moth eggs, in conjunction with pheromones to control common clothes moths, which cause serious damage to carpets, furniture, clothing and other wool and silk objects in historic buildings. The trial was abandoned in 2023; while the microwasps performed well at reducing moth populations in combination with pheromones, they were no better than pheromones alone. It was suspected that the high interiors may not have been suitable and the Trust may continue to use the wasps in smaller stores or where they can be sited close to a known infestation source.

=== Species used ===
The most commonly used species for biological control are T. atopovirilia, T. brevicapillum, T. deion, T. exiguum, T. fuentesi, T. minutum, T. nubilale, T. platneri, T. pretiosum, and T. thalense.

== T. pretiosum ==
T. pretiosum is the most widely distributed species in North America. It is a more generalized parasitoid, able to parasitise a range of different species. It has been the focus of many research studies and has been successfully reared on 18 genera of Lepidoptera. T. pretiosum was introduced into Australia in the 1970s as part of the Ord River Irrigation Area IPM scheme.

== T. carverae ==
Trichogramma carverae is mainly used for light brown apple moth and codling moth control, and is predominately used in orchards. In Australia, T. carverae is used for biological control of light brown apple moth in vineyards. Though Australia has its own native Trichogramma species, not much work has been undertaken to use them commercially for biological control within Australia.

Light brown apple moth is common throughout Australia and is polyphagous on more than 80 native and introduced species. The larvae cause the most damage, especially to grape berries, as their feeding provides sites for bunch rot to occur. Losses in the crops can amount up to $2000/ha in one season. It is very predominant in areas such as the Yarra Valley. Insecticide use is not a choice method for most growers, who prefer a more natural means of controlling pests. As a result, Trichogramma wasps were considered a good candidate for biological control, even more so as the moth larvae are difficult to control with insecticide. Moreover, light brown apple moths are relatively vulnerable to egg parasitism, with their eggs being laid in masses of 20 to 50 on the upper surfaces of basal leaves in grapevines.

== Species ==
- List of Trichogramma species
