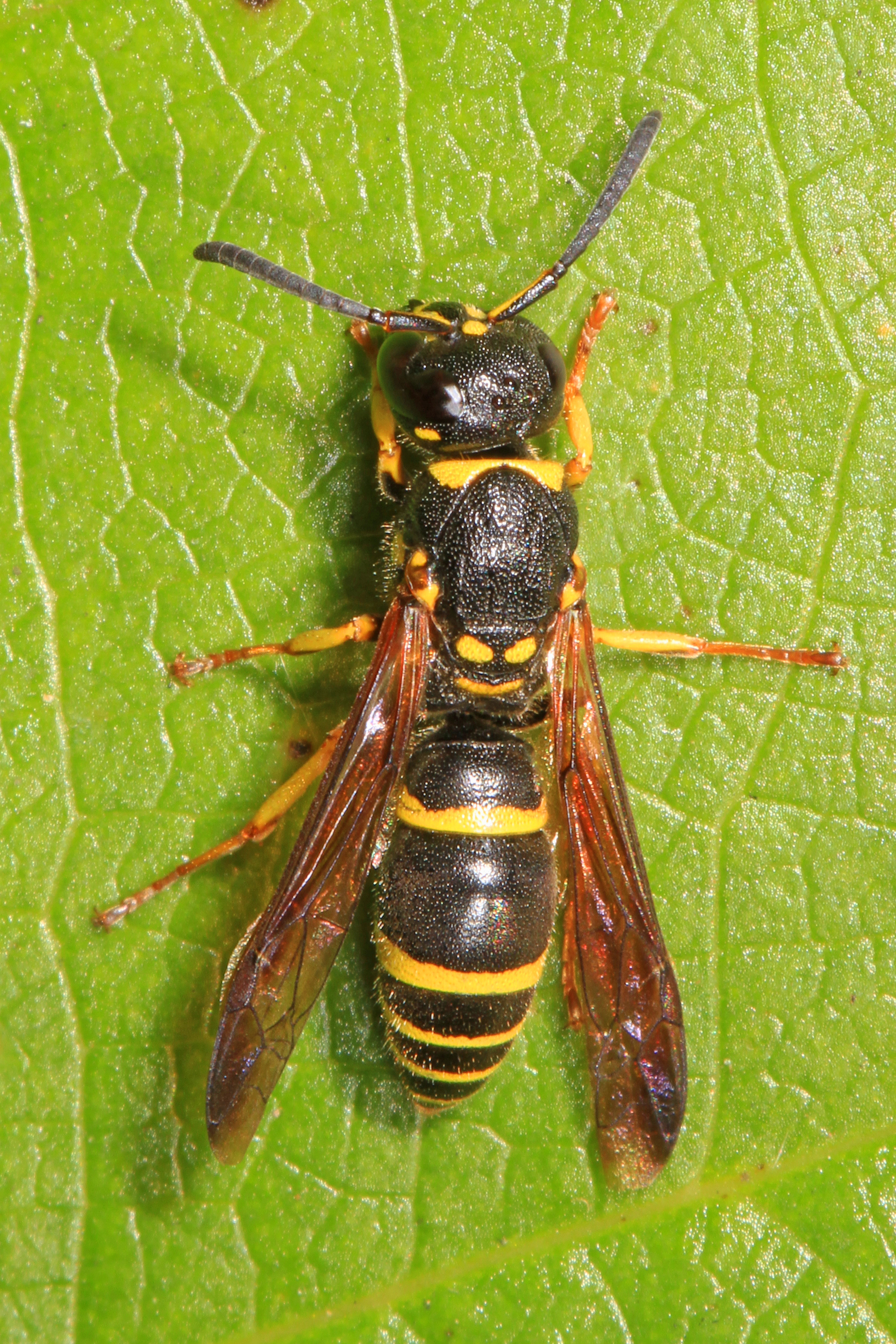

Scientific classification
- Kingdom: Animalia
- Phylum: Arthropoda
- Class: Insecta
- Order: Hymenoptera
- Family: Vespidae
- Genus: Ancistrocerus
- Species: A. adiabatus

Binomial name
- Ancistrocerus adiabatus (de Saussure, 1853)

= Ancistrocerus adiabatus =

Species of wasp

Ancistrocerus adiabatus is a species of potter wasp. Adults grow up to 11 mm (0.433 in) in length. This species is multivoltine and has been witnessed migrating.
