= Trichogramma brassicae =

Scientific classification
- Kingdom: Animalia
- Phylum: Arthropoda
- Clade: Pancrustacea
- Class: Insecta
- Order: Hymenoptera
- Family: Trichogrammatidae
- Genus: Trichogramma
- Species: T. brassicae

Binomial name
- Trichogramma brassicae Bezdenko, 1968

Species of wasp

Trichogramma brassicae is a species of parasitoid wasps from the Trichogrammatidae family. It mainly parasitizes Lepidopteran hosts in agricultural fields. They are entomaphagous parasitoids that deposit their own eggs inside the host's eggs, consuming the host egg material and emerging upon full development. They are a common biological control species that have been used commercially since the late 1970s. Inundative releases of T. brassicae, recently, can be done by means of drones and integrated control with Bacillus thuringiensis subsp. kurstaki were demonstrated effective as chemical insecticide treatments and of course without negative environmental side effects.
