= Trichogramma evanescens =

Scientific classification
- Kingdom: Animalia
- Phylum: Arthropoda
- Class: Insecta
- Order: Hymenoptera
- Family: Trichogrammatidae
- Genus: Trichogramma
- Species: T. evanescens

Binomial name
- Trichogramma evanescens Westwood, 1833

Species of wasp

Trichogramma evanescens is a 0.5mm long parasitoid wasp which parasites Lepidoptera eggs.

== Use for biocontrol ==
In the Philippines this parasitoid has been used to eradicate the Asian Corn Borer, a pest of maize in East Asia. Some companies sell this insect in the pupal stage to be deposited in fields that have Lepidoptera pests.

In 2021 the National Trust in England embarked on a trial of using T. evanescens, which parasitises clothes moth eggs, in conjunction with pheromones to control common clothes moths, which cause serious damage to carpets, furniture, clothing and other wool and silk objects in historic buildings. While the microwasps performed well at reducing moth populations in combination with pheromones, they were no better than pheromones alone. The trial has successfully continued using pheromones alone. It was suspected that the high interiors may not have been suitable and the Trust may continue to use the wasps in smaller stores or where they can be sited close to a known infestation source.
