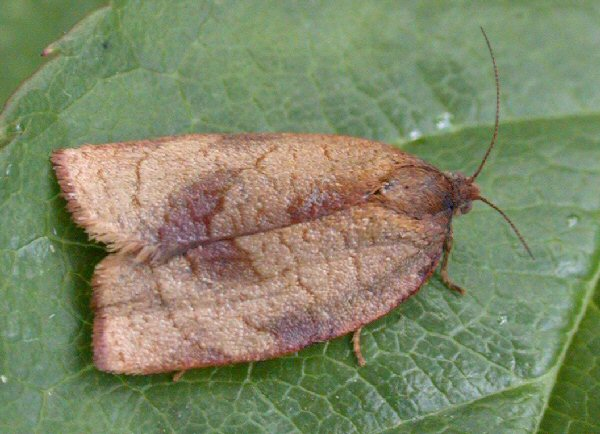
- Lozotaenia forsterana

Scientific classification
- Kingdom: Animalia
- Phylum: Arthropoda
- Clade: Pancrustacea
- Class: Insecta
- Order: Lepidoptera
- Family: Tortricidae
- Subfamily: Tortricinae
- Tribe: Archipini; Pierce & Metcalfe, 1922

Genera
- See text

Synonyms
- Apheliinae Guenee, 1845; Carpocapsidae Stainton, 1858; Chresmarchinae Diakonoff, 1939; Cacoeciinae Diakonoff, 1939; Zacoriscinae Diakonoff, 1941; Ramapesiini Razowski, 1993

= Archipini =

Tribe of moths

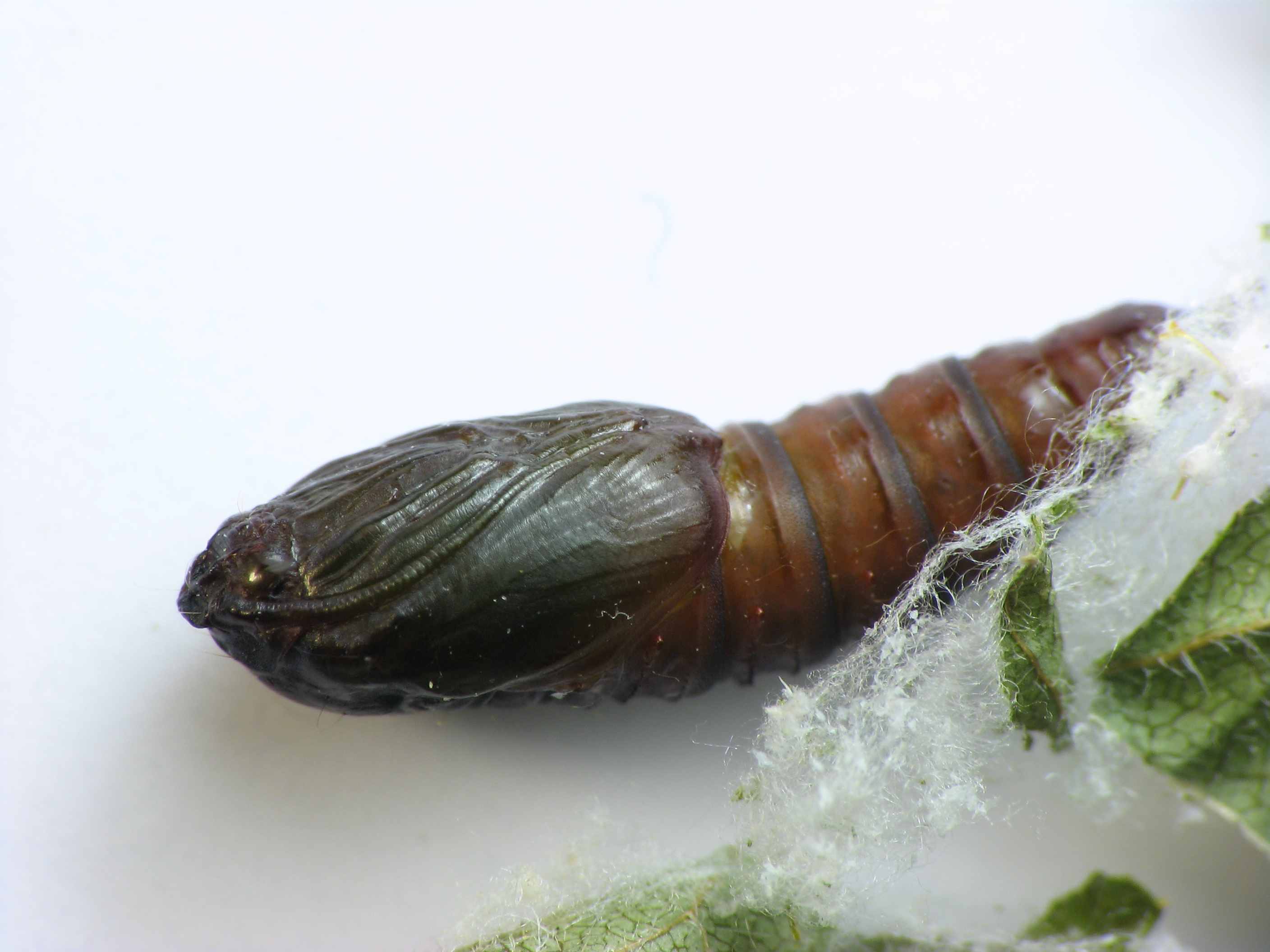
Choristoneura rosaceana pupa

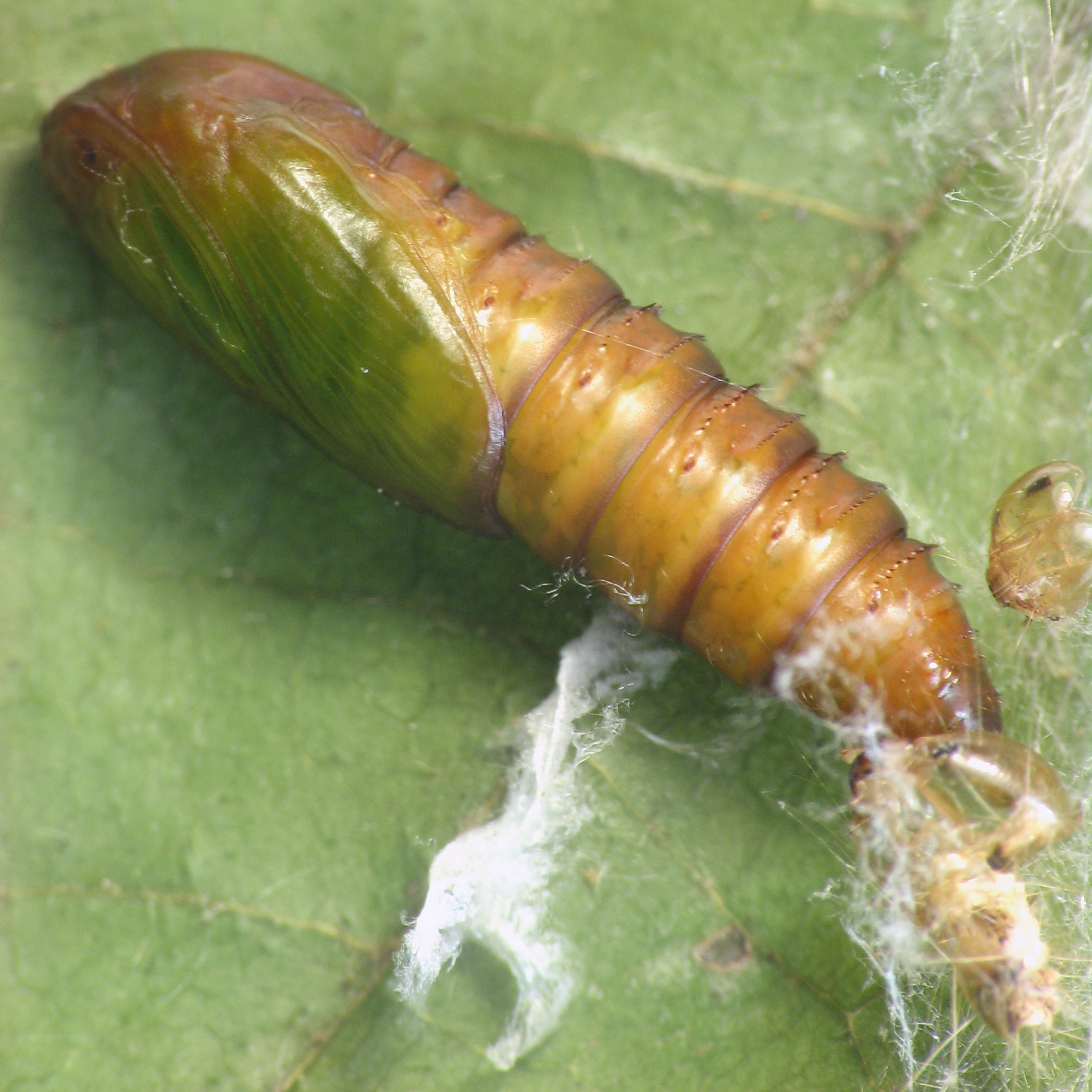
Pandemis limitata pupa

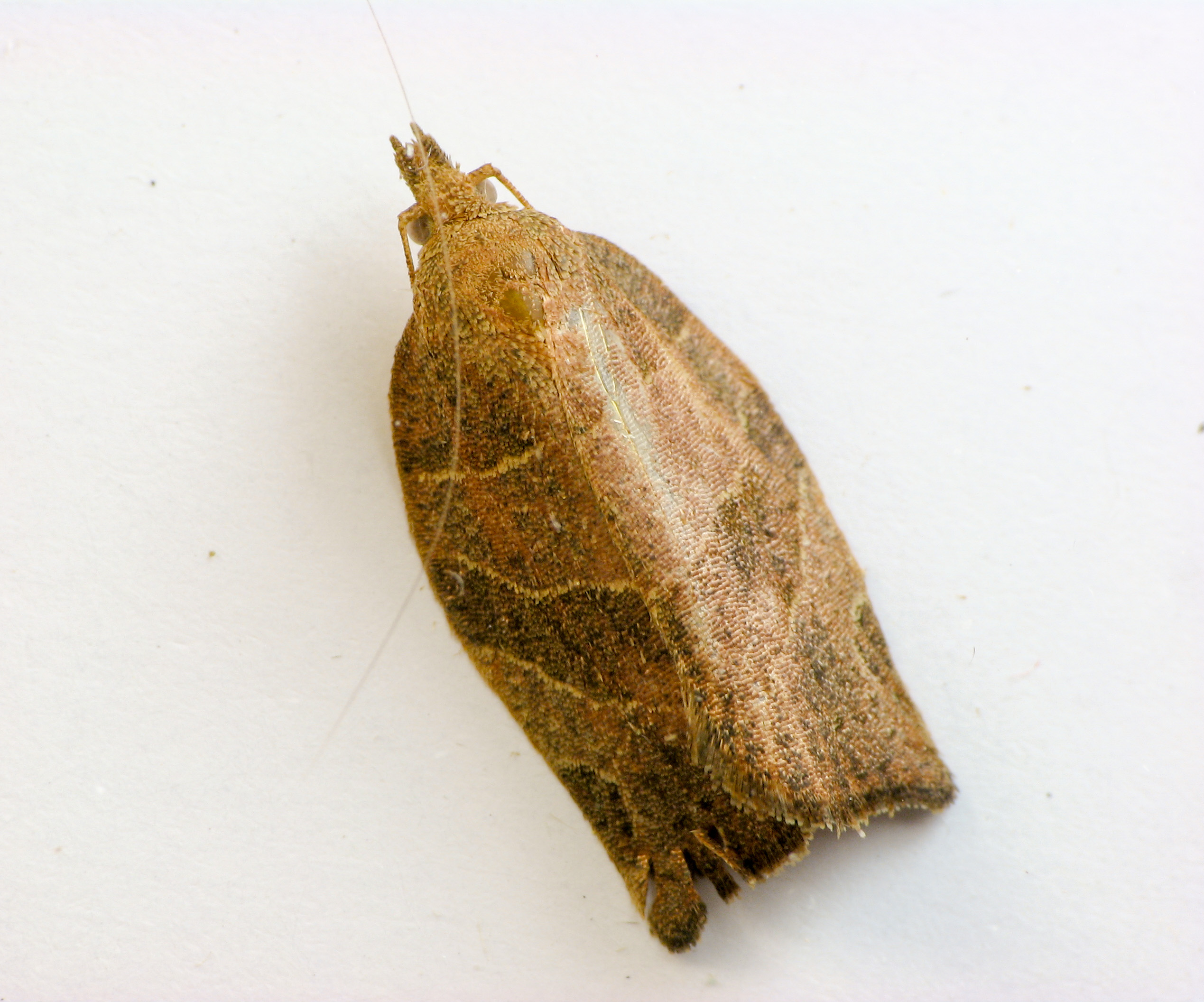
Pandemis limitata

The Archipini are a tribe of tortrix moths. Since many genera of these are not yet assigned to tribes, the genus list presented here is provisional.

== Diversity ==
Archipini is the largest tribe in the Tortricinae subfamily, containing over 1,600 described species in about 150 genera.

== Distribution ==
Archipini are found in all ecoregions, although there are only few species in the Neotropical realm.

== Biology ==
Many of the economically important pests among the tortrix moths belong to this tribe, for example the Light brown apple moth and the spruce budworms. The larvae are often polyphagous.

== Genera ==
- Abrepagoge
- Acroceuthes
- Acropolitis
- Adoxophyes
- Allodemis
- Ancyroclepsis
- Aneuxanthis
- Anisotenes
- Anthophrys
- Antiphrastis
- Aoupinieta
- Aphelia
- Aphthonocosma
- Archepandemis
- Archidemis
- Archips
- Argyrotaenia
- Aristocosma
- Arizelana
- Ascerodes
- Asteriognatha
- Atelodora
- Authomaema
- Avaria
- Bactrostoma
- Balioxena
- Battalia
- Borboniella
- Borneogena
- Brachyvalva
- Cacoecimorpha
- Callibryastis
- Capua
- Carphomigma
- Catamacta
- Ceramea
- Ceritaenia
- Chamaepsichia
- Chionothremma
- Chiraps
- Chirapsina
- Choanograptis
- Choristoneura
- Claduncaria
- Clepsis
- Coeloptera
- Cornips
- Cornuclepsis
- Cornusaccula
- Cosmiophrys
- Cryptomelaena
- Cryptoptila
- Ctenopseustis
- Cudonigera
- Cununcus
- Cuspidata
- Daemilus
- Dentisociaria
- Diactora
- Dicanticinta
- Dicellitis
- Dichelia
- Dichelopa
- Diedra
- Digitosa
- Diplocalyptis
- Ditula
- Droceta
- Durangarchips
- Dynatocephala
- Ecclitica
- Egogepa
- Electraglaia
- Epagoge
- Epalxiphora
- Epichorista
- Epichoristodes
- Epiphyas
- Ericodesma
- Eurythecta
- Exorstaenia
- Farragona
- Furcataenia
- Furcinula
- Gelophaula
- Geogepa
- Gephyraspis
- Glyphidoptera
- Gnorismoneura
- Gongylotypa
- Goniotorna
- Harmologa
- Hectaphelia
- Heterochorista
- Hiceteria
- Homona
- Homonoides
- Homonopsis
- Idolatteria
- Isochorista
- Isodemis
- Isotenes
- Josefrazowskia
- Kanikehia
- Labidosa
- Leontochroma
- Leptochroptila
- Leucotenes
- Lozotaenia
- Lozotaeniodes
- Lumaria
- Mantua
- Meridemis
- Merophyas
- Mersa
- Mesocalyptis
- Metamesia
- Mictopsichia
- Midaellobes
- Minutargyrotoza
- Neocalyptis
- Nexosa
- Niphothixa
- Nkandla
- Notioclepsis
- Nuritamburia
- Ochetarcha
- Ochrotaenia
- Orilesa
- Panaphelix
- Pandemis
- Paradichelia
- Paramesia
- Paramesiodes
- Paraphasis
- Pararrhaptica
- Periclepsis
- Peteliacma
- Petridia
- Phaenacropista
- Phalarotortrix
- Philedone
- Philedonides
- Philocryptica
- Phlebozemia
- Planostocha
- Planotortrix
- Platyhomonopsis
- Platysemaphora
- Procalyptis
- Procrica
- Pseudeulia
- Pteridoporthis
- Pternozyga
- Ptycholoma
- Ptycholomoides
- Pyrgotis
- Pyrsarcha
- Raisapoana
- Rubropsichia
- Saetotaenia
- Scotiophyes
- Snodgrassia
- Sorensenata
- Spheterista
- Spinotaenia
- Sychnochlaena
- Sychnovalva
- Syndemis
- Synochoneura
- Tacertaenia
- Terricula
- Terthreutis
- Thrincophora
- Tosirips
- Tremophora
- Tuckia
- Ulodemis
- Vialonga
- Viettea
- Williella
- Xenophylla
- Xenotemna
- Xenothictis
- Zacorisca

== Unplaced species ==
- Anisogona placoxantha Lower, 1896
- Archips socotranus Walsingham, 1900
- Argyrotoxa pompica Turner, 1925
- Arotrophora chionaula Meyrick, 1910
- Arotrophora cosmoplaca Lower, 1903
- Cacoecia clivigera Meyrick, 1932
- Cacoecia desmotana Meyrick, 1881
- Cacoecia mansueta Meyrick, 1923
- Cacoecia mnemosynana Meyrick, 1881
- Cacoecia ophiodesma Lower, 1902
- Cacoecia recurvana Zeller, 1866
- Cacoecia tessulatana Meyrick, 1881
- Capua acrita Turner, 1916
- Capua adynata Turner, 1945
- Capua arrosta Turner, 1945
- Capua arrythmodes Turner, 1946
- Capua asemantica Turner, 1927
- Capua belophora Turner, 1945
- Capua castanitis Turner, 1925
- Capua catharia Turner, 1926
- Capua ceramica Lower, 1908
- Capua cnaphalodes Meyrick, 1910
- Capua confragosa Meyrick, 1922
- Capua deuterastis Meyrick, 1910
- Capua dryina Meyrick, 1910
- Capua effulgens Meyrick, 1910
- Capua ephedra Meyrick, 1910
- Capua eugrapta Turner, 1927
- Capua euryochra Turner, 1914
- Capua gongylia Turner, 1925
- Capua hedyma Turner, 1915
- Capua hemicosmana Meyrick, 1881
- Capua ischnomorpha Turner, 1945
- Capua leptospila Lower, 1901
- Capua leucobela Turner, 1945
- Capua leucospila Lower, 1893
- Capua leucostacta Meyrick, 1910
- Capua montanana Meyrick, 1881
- Capua multistriata Turner, 1945
- Capua naias Turner, 1916
- Capua notograpta Meyrick, 1910
- Capua notopasta Turner, 1945
- Capua nummulata Meyrick, 1910
- Capua ophthalmias Meyrick, 1910
- Capua oxygona Lower, 1899
- Capua paraloxa Meyrick, 1910
- Capua parastactis Meyrick, 1910
- Capua phaeosema Turner, 1945
- Capua phellodes Meyrick, 1910
- Capua phryctora Meyrick, 1910
- Capua poliobaphes Turner, 1926
- Capua ptilocrossa Meyrick, 1914
- Capua pylora Meyrick, 1938
- Capua scaphosema Turner, 1945
- Capua tapinopis Turner, 1945
- Capua tarachota Meyrick, 1910
- Capua tetraplasia Turner, 1916
- Capua thiodyta Meyrick, 1931
- Capua triadelpha Meyrick, 1920
- Cnephasia argyrocosma Turner, 1925
- Cnephasia bleptodora Turner, 1925
- Cnephasia catarrapha Turner, 1945
- Cnephasia contortula Turner, 1927
- Cnephasia crotala Meyrick, 1910
- Cnephasia lenaea Meyrick, 1910
- Cnephasia mermera Meyrick, 1910
- Cnephasia orthias Meyrick, 1910
- Cnephasia phosphora Meyrick, 1910
- Cnephasia stereodes Meyrick, 1910
- Cnephasia thiopasta Turner, 1915
- Conchylis amoenana Walker, 1863
- Conchylis tasmaniana Walker, 1863
- Crambus humerellus Walker, 1866
- Dichelia atristrigana Meyrick, 1881
- Dichelia clarana Meyrick, 1881
- Dichelia cosmopis Lower, 1894
- Dichelia hyperetana Meyrick, 1881
- Dichelia sobriana Walker, 1863
- Dichelia thermaterimma Lower, 1893
- Dipterina gnophodryas Lower, 1902
- Dipterina refluana Meyrick, 1881
- Dipterina rupicolana Meyrick, 1881
- Dipterina tribolana Meyrick, 1881
- Epichorista serena Meyrick, 1910
- Homona biscutata Meyrick, 1931
- Isochorista cerophanes Meyrick, 1910
- Proselena camacinana Meyrick, 1882
- Teras mersana Walker, 1863
- Tortrix agroeca Meyrick, 1908
- Tortrix agrypna Meyrick, 1910
- Tortrix alysidina Turner, 1927
- Tortrix arcaria Meyrick, 1910
- Tortrix campylosema Turner, 1945
- Tortrix campylosticha Turner, 1939
- Tortrix cataractis Meyrick, 1910
- Tortrix celatrix Turner, 1916
- Tortrix chalicodes Meyrick, 1920
- Tortrix concolorana Meyrick, 1881
- Tortrix constrictana Walker, 1866
- Tortrix cratista Walsingham, 1914
- Tortrix diametrica Meyrick, 1932
- Tortrix dinota Meyrick, 1918
- Tortrix dyschroa Turner, 1927
- Tortrix entherma Meyrick, 1914
- Tortrix eusticha Turner, 1945
- Tortrix furtiva Meyrick, 1911
- Tortrix haplopolia Turner, 1939
- Tortrix hilarantha Meyrick, 1918
- Tortrix hilarantha Meyrick, 1918
- Tortrix hilarantha Meyrick, 1918
- Tortrix hilarantha Meyrick, 1918
- Tortrix hydractis Meyrick, 1910
- Tortrix hyperptycha Meyrick, in Caradja, 1931
- Tortrix incompta Turner, 1927
- Tortrix liquefacta Meyrick, 1908
- Tortrix olgana Kennel, 1919
- Tortrix oressinoma Turner, 1925
- Tortrix oriarcha Meyrick, 1910
- Tortrix parana Busck, 1911
- Tortrix phaeoneura Turner, 1945
- Tortrix plagiomochla Turner, 1945
- Tortrix polymicta Turner, 1927
- Tortrix polyphrica Turner, 1927
- Tortrix procapna Turner, 1945
- Tortrix rhodochropa Meyrick, 1927
- Tortrix scaeodoxa Meyrick, 1935
- Tortrix spilographa Meyrick, 1937
- Tortrix standishana Newman, 1856
- Tortrix stigmatias Meyrick, 1910
- Tortrix technica Turner, 1939
- Tortrix technitis Meyrick, 1910
- Tortrix telephanta Meyrick, 1910
- Tortrix tephrodes Turner, 1916

== Selected former genera ==
- Bradleyella
- Doridostoma
- Hypsidracon
- Xeneda
