= Cununcus =

Scientific classification
- Kingdom: Animalia
- Phylum: Arthropoda
- Clade: Pancrustacea
- Class: Insecta
- Order: Lepidoptera
- Family: Tortricidae
- Tribe: Archipini
- Genus: Cununcus; Razowski & Becker, 2000

Genus of tortrix moths

Cununcus is a genus of moths belonging to the family Tortricidae.

== Species ==
- Cununcus phylarchus Razowski & Becker, 2000

== See also ==
- List of Tortricidae genera
