= Furcataenia =

Scientific classification
- Kingdom: Animalia
- Phylum: Arthropoda
- Clade: Pancrustacea
- Class: Insecta
- Order: Lepidoptera
- Family: Tortricidae
- Tribe: Archipini
- Genus: Furcataenia; Razowski & Becker, 2000

Genus of tortrix moths

Furcataenia is a genus of moths belonging to the family Tortricidae.

== Species ==
- Furcataenia bifida Razowski & Becker, 2000
- Furcataenia cholosaccula Razowski & Becker, 2000
- Furcataenia marabana Razowski & Becker, 2000
- Furcataenia monofida Razowski & Becker, 2000
- Furcataenia trifida Razowski & Becker, 2000

== See also ==
- List of Tortricidae genera
