= Bactrostoma cinis =

Scientific classification
- Kingdom: Animalia
- Phylum: Arthropoda
- Class: Insecta
- Order: Lepidoptera
- Family: Tortricidae
- Genus: Bactrostoma
- Species: B. cinis

Binomial name
- Bactrostoma cinis Diakonoff, 1960

Species of moth

Bactrostoma cinis is a species of moth of the family Tortricidae. It is found in Madagascar.
