= Callibryastis =

Scientific classification
- Kingdom: Animalia
- Phylum: Arthropoda
- Class: Insecta
- Order: Lepidoptera
- Family: Tortricidae
- Tribe: Archipini
- Genus: Callibryastis; Meyrick, 1912
- Species: C. pachnota

Binomial name
- Callibryastis pachnota Meyrick, 1912

Monotypic genus of tortrix moths

Callibryastis is a genus of moths belonging to the subfamily Tortricinae of the family Tortricidae. It contains only one species, Callibryastis pachnota, which is found in Vietnam and India.

Adults usually have almost unicolorous blackish brown forewings.

== See also ==
- List of Tortricidae genera
