= Phaenacropista compsa =

Scientific classification
- Domain: Eukaryota
- Kingdom: Animalia
- Phylum: Arthropoda
- Class: Insecta
- Order: Lepidoptera
- Family: Tortricidae
- Genus: Phaenacropista
- Species: P. compsa

Binomial name
- Phaenacropista compsa Diakonoff, 1983

Species of moth

Phaenacropista compsa is a species of moth of the family Tortricidae. It is found on Sumatra in Indonesia.
