= Archidemis anastea =

Scientific classification
- Kingdom: Animalia
- Phylum: Arthropoda
- Class: Insecta
- Order: Lepidoptera
- Family: Tortricidae
- Genus: Archidemis
- Species: A. anastea

Binomial name
- Archidemis anastea Diakonoff, 1968

Species of moth

Archidemis anastea is a species of moth of the family Tortricidae. It is found in Mindanao in the Philippines.
