= Spinotaenia =

Scientific classification
- Kingdom: Animalia
- Phylum: Arthropoda
- Clade: Pancrustacea
- Class: Insecta
- Order: Lepidoptera
- Family: Tortricidae
- Tribe: Archipini
- Genus: Spinotaenia; Razowski & Becker, 2000
- Species: S. chalcea

Binomial name
- Spinotaenia chalcea Razowski & Becker, 2000

Monotypic genus of tortrix moths

Spinotaenia is a genus of moths belonging to the family Tortricidae. It contains only one species, Spinotaenia chalcea, which is found in Brazil (Parana).

== See also ==
- List of Tortricidae genera
