= Cornusaccula periopa =

Scientific classification
- Domain: Eukaryota
- Kingdom: Animalia
- Phylum: Arthropoda
- Class: Insecta
- Order: Lepidoptera
- Family: Tortricidae
- Genus: Cornusaccula
- Species: C. periopa

Binomial name
- Cornusaccula periopa Diakonoff, 1960

Species of moth

Cornusaccula periopa is a species of moth of the family Tortricidae. It is found in Madagascar.
