= Exorstaenia nova =

Scientific classification
- Kingdom: Animalia
- Phylum: Arthropoda
- Clade: Pancrustacea
- Class: Insecta
- Order: Lepidoptera
- Family: Tortricidae
- Genus: Exorstaenia
- Species: E. nova

Binomial name
- Exorstaenia nova Razowski & Becker, 2000

Species of moth

Exorstaenia nova is a species of moth of the family Tortricidae. It is found in São Paulo, Brazil.
