= Phlebozemia =

Scientific classification
- Domain: Eukaryota
- Kingdom: Animalia
- Phylum: Arthropoda
- Class: Insecta
- Order: Lepidoptera
- Family: Tortricidae
- Tribe: Archipini
- Genus: Phlebozemia; Diakonoff, 1985
- Species: P. sandrinae

Binomial name
- Phlebozemia sandrinae Diakonoff, in Diakonoff, Ulenberg & Vari, 1985

Monotypic genus of tortrix moths

Phlebozemia is a genus of moths belonging to the subfamily Tortricinae of the family Tortricidae. It contains only one species, Phlebozemia sandrinae, which is found in South Africa.

The larvae feed on Nerine bowdenii.

== See also ==
- List of Tortricidae genera
