= Dentisociaria armata =

Scientific classification
- Domain: Eukaryota
- Kingdom: Animalia
- Phylum: Arthropoda
- Class: Insecta
- Order: Lepidoptera
- Family: Tortricidae
- Genus: Dentisociaria
- Species: D. armata

Binomial name
- Dentisociaria armata Kuznetsov, 1970

Species of moth

Dentisociaria armata is a species of moth of the family Tortricidae. It is found in the Russian Far East (Amur, Primorsky Krai), China and Japan. The habitat consists of broad-leaved forests, but the species has also been observed in inhabited areas such as parks.

The wingspan is 15–23 mm. Adults have been recorded on wing from July to September.

== Subspecies ==
- Dentisociaria armata armata
- Dentisociaria armata okui Yasuda, 1975 (Japan)
