= Paraphasis =

Scientific classification
- Domain: Eukaryota
- Kingdom: Animalia
- Phylum: Arthropoda
- Class: Insecta
- Order: Lepidoptera
- Family: Tortricidae
- Tribe: Archipini
- Genus: Paraphasis; Walsingham, 1907
- Species: P. perkinsi

Binomial name
- Paraphasis perkinsi Walsingham in Sharp, 1907

Monotypic genus of tortrix moths

Paraphasis is a monotypic moth genus of the family Tortricidae described by Lord Walsingham in 1907. Its only species, Paraphasis perkinsi, described by the same author in the same year, is endemic to the Hawaiian island of Kauai.

== See also ==
- List of Tortricidae genera
