= Dicanticinta diticinctana =

Scientific classification
- Domain: Eukaryota
- Kingdom: Animalia
- Phylum: Arthropoda
- Class: Insecta
- Order: Lepidoptera
- Family: Tortricidae
- Genus: Dicanticinta
- Species: D. diticinctana

Binomial name
- Dicanticinta diticinctana (Walsingham, 1900)

Synonyms
- Tortrix diticinctana Walsingham, 1900

Species of moth

Dicanticinta diticinctana is a species of moth of the family Tortricidae. It is found in Japan (the islands of Honshu, Kyushu and Hokkaido) and possibly China.

The wingspan is 15–16 mm. Adults are on wing from the end of June to mid-July.

The larvae have been recorded feeding on Syringa reticulata.
