= Dicellitis =

Scientific classification
- Kingdom: Animalia
- Phylum: Arthropoda
- Class: Insecta
- Order: Lepidoptera
- Family: Tortricidae
- Tribe: Archipini
- Genus: Dicellitis; Meyrick, 1908

Genus of tortrix moths

Dicellitis is a genus of moths belonging to the subfamily Tortricinae of the family Tortricidae.

== Species ==
- Dicellitis cornucopiae Diakonoff, 1941
- Dicellitis furcigera Meyrick, 1928
- Dicellitis nigritula Meyrick, 1908

== See also ==
- List of Tortricidae genera
