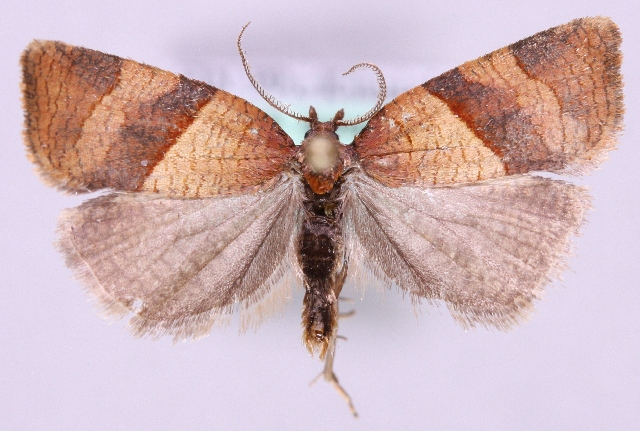

Scientific classification
- Kingdom: Animalia
- Phylum: Arthropoda
- Class: Insecta
- Order: Lepidoptera
- Family: Tortricidae
- Tribe: Archipini
- Genus: Philedone; Hubner, [1825]
- Species: P. gerningana

Binomial name
- Philedone gerningana ([ Denis & Schiffermuller ], 1775)

Synonyms
- List: Amphisa Curtis, 1828; Amphysa Guenee, 1845; Tortrix gerningana [Denis & Schiffermuller], 1775; Amphisa gerningiana Stephens, 1829; Tortrix pectinana Hubner, [1796-1799]

= Philedone =

Genus of moths

Philedone is a genus of moths belonging to the subfamily Tortricinae of the family Tortricidae. It contains only one species, Philedone gerningana, the cinquefoil tortrix or cinquefoil twist, which is found in Asia and Europe. It was first described by the Austrian lepidopterists Michael Denis and Ignaz Schiffermüller in 1775.

== Description ==
The wingspan is 13-16 mm. The antennal pectinations are moderately long. The forewings are yellow-ochreous, darker-strigulated. The basal area is browner and undefined. There is a broad central fascia and costal patch, both red-brown. The hindwings are rather dark grey. The larva is dull greenish; head is reddish-ochreous.

The larvae are polyphagous, feeding on Lotus, Plantago, Scabiosa, Peucedanum, Potentilla and Vaccinium species, as well as thrift (Armeria maritima), aspen (Populus tremula) Sitka spruce (Picea sitchensis) and silver fir (Abies alba). They feed in May and June, in uncultivated areas on spun leaves and flowers,

== Distribution ==
Philedone gerningana is found in most of Europe (except Portugal and the southern part of the Balkan Peninsula) and the Near East, east to eastern Russia. The main habitat is heath.

== See also ==
- List of Tortricidae genera
