= Allodemis =

Scientific classification
- Domain: Eukaryota
- Kingdom: Animalia
- Phylum: Arthropoda
- Class: Insecta
- Order: Lepidoptera
- Family: Tortricidae
- Tribe: Archipini
- Genus: Allodemis; Diakonoff, 1983

Genus of tortrix moths

Allodemis is a genus of moths belonging to the subfamily Tortricinae of the family Tortricidae.

== Species ==
- Allodemis chelophora (Meyrick, 1910)
- Allodemis dionysia Diakonoff, 1983
- Allodemis euhelias Diakonoff, 1983
- Allodemis fulva Diakonoff, 1983
- Allodemis pullatana (Snellen, 1902)
- Allodemis stegopa Diakonoff, 1983

== See also ==
- List of Tortricidae genera
