= Brachyvalva inoffensa =

Scientific classification
- Kingdom: Animalia
- Phylum: Arthropoda
- Class: Insecta
- Order: Lepidoptera
- Family: Tortricidae
- Genus: Brachyvalva
- Species: B. inoffensa

Binomial name
- Brachyvalva inoffensa Diakonoff, 1960

Species of moth

Brachyvalva inoffensa is a species of moth of the family Tortricidae. It is found in Madagascar.
