= Asteriognatha =

Scientific classification
- Domain: Eukaryota
- Kingdom: Animalia
- Phylum: Arthropoda
- Class: Insecta
- Order: Lepidoptera
- Family: Tortricidae
- Tribe: Archipini
- Genus: Asteriognatha; Diakonoff, 1983

Genus of tortrix moths

Asteriognatha is a genus of moths belonging to family Tortricidae.

== Species ==
- Asteriognatha cyclocentra Diakonoff, 1983
- Asteriognatha metriotera Diakonoff, 1983

== See also ==
- List of Tortricidae genera
