= Tortrix tephrodes =

"Tortrix" tephrodes

Scientific classification
- Kingdom: Animalia
- Phylum: Arthropoda
- Clade: Pancrustacea
- Class: Insecta
- Order: Lepidoptera
- Family: Tortricidae
- Subfamily: Tortricinae
- Tribe: Archipini
- Genus: incertae sedis
- Species: "T." tephrodes

Binomial name
- "Tortrix" tephrodes

Synonyms
- Technitis tephrodes

Species of moth

"Tortrix" tephrodes is a species of moth of the family Tortricidae. It is found in Australia, where it has been recorded from New South Wales.

The wingspan is 18–20 mm. The forewings are whitish, irrorated with grey and with grey markings and patchy ferruginous irroration. The hindwings are grey.
