= Xenophylla =

Scientific classification
- Kingdom: Animalia
- Phylum: Arthropoda
- Class: Insecta
- Order: Lepidoptera
- Family: Tortricidae
- Tribe: Archipini
- Genus: Xenophylla; Diakonoff, 1960
- Species: X. megalogona

Binomial name
- Xenophylla megalogona (Diakonoff, 1947)

Synonyms
- Cacoecia megalogona Diakonoff, 1947

Monotypic genus of tortrix moths

Xenophylla is a genus of moths belonging to the subfamily Tortricinae of the family Tortricidae. It contains only one species, Xenophylla megalogona, which is found on Madagascar.

== See also ==
- List of Tortricidae genera
