= Ancyroclepsis nakhasathieni =

Scientific classification
- Domain: Eukaryota
- Kingdom: Animalia
- Phylum: Arthropoda
- Class: Insecta
- Order: Lepidoptera
- Family: Tortricidae
- Genus: Ancyroclepsis
- Species: A. nakhasathieni

Binomial name
- Ancyroclepsis nakhasathieni Tuck, 1995

Species of moth

Ancyroclepsis nakhasathieni is a species of moth of the family Tortricidae. It is found in Thailand.
