= Furcinula punctulata =

Scientific classification
- Domain: Eukaryota
- Kingdom: Animalia
- Phylum: Arthropoda
- Class: Insecta
- Order: Lepidoptera
- Family: Tortricidae
- Genus: Furcinula
- Species: F. punctulata

Binomial name
- Furcinula punctulata Diakonoff, 1960

Species of moth

Furcinula punctulata is a species of moth of the family Tortricidae. It is found in Madagascar.
