= Egogepa zosta =

Scientific classification
- Domain: Eukaryota
- Kingdom: Animalia
- Phylum: Arthropoda
- Class: Insecta
- Order: Lepidoptera
- Family: Tortricidae
- Genus: Egogepa
- Species: E. zosta

Binomial name
- Egogepa zosta Razowski, 1977

Species of moth

Egogepa zosta is a species of moth of the family Tortricidae. It is found in Zhejiang, China.
