= Mersa (moth) =

Scientific classification
- Kingdom: Animalia
- Phylum: Arthropoda
- Class: Insecta
- Order: Lepidoptera
- Family: Tortricidae
- Tribe: Archipini
- Genus: Mersa; Razowski, 2013
- Species: M. metochia

Binomial name
- Mersa metochia Razowski, 2013

Species of moth

Mersa is a monotypic moth genus of the family Tortricidae. Its only species, Mersa metochia, is found on Seram Island in Indonesia. Both the genus and species were first described by Józef Razowski in 2013. The habitat consists of lower montane forests at altitudes of about 1,470 meters.

The wingspan is about 16 mm.
