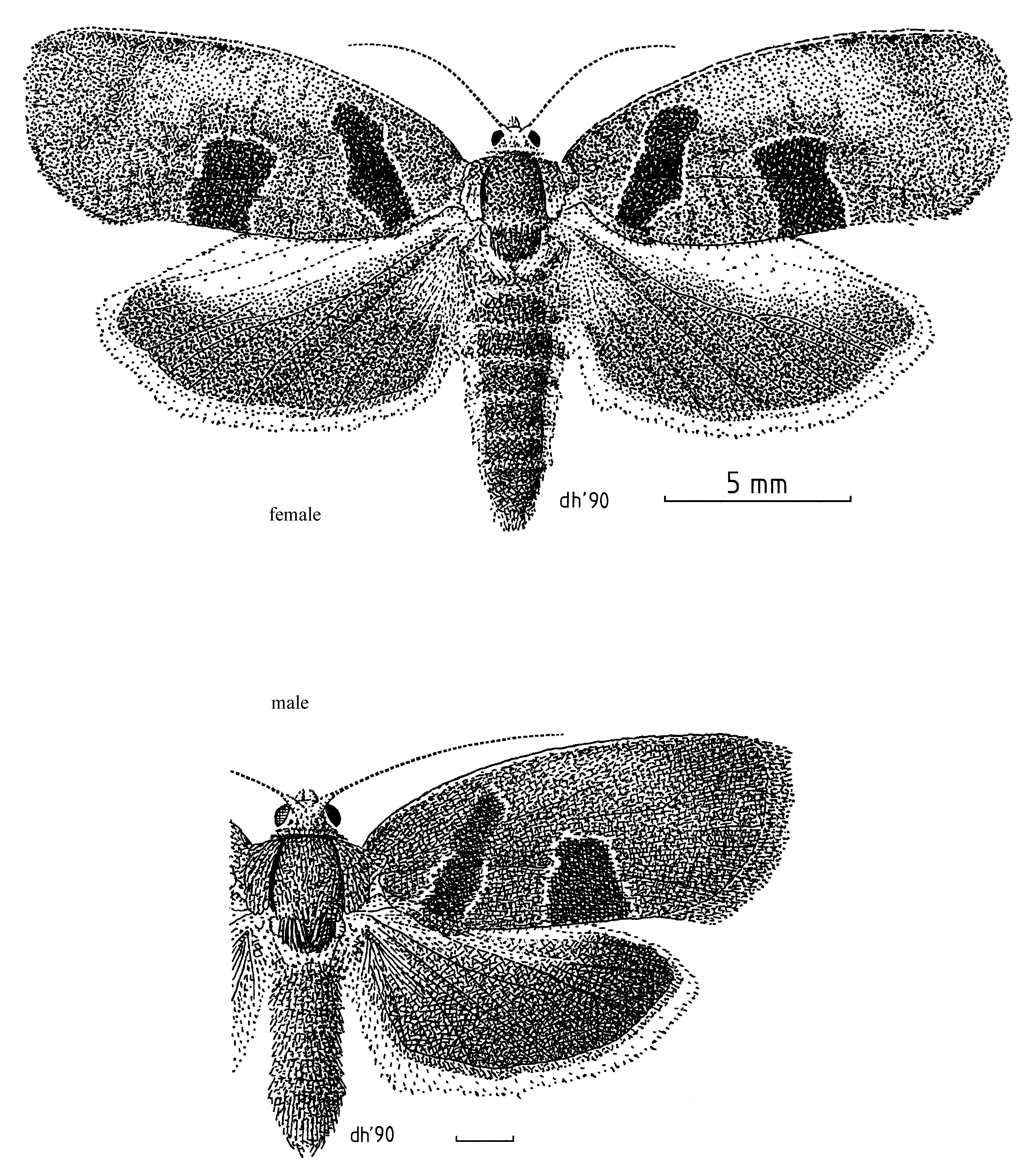
- Ochetarcha sp. (undescribed) illustration by Des Helmore

Scientific classification
- Kingdom: Animalia
- Phylum: Arthropoda
- Class: Insecta
- Order: Lepidoptera
- Family: Tortricidae
- Tribe: Archipini
- Genus: Ochetarcha; Meyrick, 1924
- Species: O. miraculosa

Binomial name
- Ochetarcha miraculosa (Meyrick, 1917)

Synonyms
- Olindia miraculosa Meyrick, 1917

= Ochetarcha =

Monotypic genus of tortrix moths

Ochetarcha is a genus of moths belonging to the subfamily Tortricinae of the family Tortricidae. It contains only one described species, Ochetarcha miraculosa, also known as the ponga stem borer, which is found in New Zealand.

== Description ==
The mature larva of this species is coloured a creamish-yellow and is between 15 and 20 mm long.

The wingspan is about 23 mm. The forewings pale-brownish, strigulated with purplish-grey. The extreme costal edge is whitish-ochreous and there is some purplish suffusion towards the base of the costa. The hindwings are dark grey.

== Behaviour ==
The larva of this species create a sticky cone formed from its waste on the stems of its host plant. The larvae consume the fronds of its host toward the tip of stem and make tunnels of between 8 and 10 mm long. When at rest the adult moth holds its wings at a v-shaped angle. The adult moths are on the wing from December to March.

== Hosts ==
The larval host of this species Cyathea dealbata.
