= Platysemaphora =

Scientific classification
- Domain: Eukaryota
- Kingdom: Animalia
- Phylum: Arthropoda
- Class: Insecta
- Order: Lepidoptera
- Family: Tortricidae
- Tribe: Archipini
- Genus: Platysemaphora; Diakonoff, 1960
- Species: P. rubiginosa

Binomial name
- Platysemaphora rubiginosa Diakonoff, 1960

Monotypic genus of tortrix moths

Platysemaphora is a monotypic moth genus belonging to the subfamily Tortricinae of the family Tortricidae. Its only species, Platysemaphora rubiginosa, is found on Madagascar. Both the genus and species were first described by Alexey Diakonoff in 1960.

== See also ==
- List of Tortricidae genera
