= Ochrotaenia =

Scientific classification
- Kingdom: Animalia
- Phylum: Arthropoda
- Clade: Pancrustacea
- Class: Insecta
- Order: Lepidoptera
- Family: Tortricidae
- Tribe: Archipini
- Genus: Ochrotaenia; Razowski & Becker, 2000
- Species: O. flexa

Binomial name
- Ochrotaenia flexa Razowski & Becker, 2000

Monotypic genus of tortrix moths

Ochrotaenia is a genus of moths belonging to the family Tortricidae. It contains only one species, Ochrotaenia flexa, which is found in Brazil (Minas Gerais).

== See also ==
- List of Tortricidae genera
