= Leucotenes coprosmae =

Scientific classification
- Domain: Eukaryota
- Kingdom: Animalia
- Phylum: Arthropoda
- Class: Insecta
- Order: Lepidoptera
- Family: Tortricidae
- Genus: Leucotenes
- Species: L. coprosmae

Binomial name
- Leucotenes coprosmae (Dugdale, 1988)

Synonyms
- Planotortrix coprosmae Dugdale, 1988

Species of moth

Leucotenes coprosmae is a species of moth of the family Tortricidae. It is found in New Zealand, where it has been recorded from the North and South islands, as well as Stewart Island.

The wingspan is 14–26 mm.
