= Gongylotypa =

Scientific classification
- Domain: Eukaryota
- Kingdom: Animalia
- Phylum: Arthropoda
- Class: Insecta
- Order: Lepidoptera
- Family: Tortricidae
- Tribe: Archipini
- Genus: Gongylotypa; Diakonoff, 1984

Genus of tortrix moths

Gongylotypa is a genus of moths belonging to the family Tortricidae.

== Species ==
- Gongylotypa anaetia Diakonoff, 1984

== See also ==
- List of Tortricidae genera
