= Homonoides =

Scientific classification
- Kingdom: Animalia
- Phylum: Arthropoda
- Class: Insecta
- Order: Lepidoptera
- Family: Tortricidae
- Tribe: Archipini
- Genus: Homonoides; Diakonoff, 1960
- Species: H. euryplaca

Binomial name
- Homonoides euryplaca (Meyrick, 1933)

Synonyms
- Batodes euryplaca Meyrick, 1933

Genus of tortrix moths

Homonoides is a genus of moths belonging to the subfamily Tortricinae of the family Tortricidae. It contains only one species, Homonoides euryplaca, which is found in Madagascar.

== See also ==
- List of Tortricidae genera
