= Gephyraspis contranota =

Scientific classification
- Domain: Eukaryota
- Kingdom: Animalia
- Phylum: Arthropoda
- Class: Insecta
- Order: Lepidoptera
- Family: Tortricidae
- Genus: Gephyraspis
- Species: G. contranota

Binomial name
- Gephyraspis contranota Diakonoff, 1973

Species of moth

Gephyraspis contranota is a species of moth of the family Tortricidae. It is found in Madagascar.
