= Cosmiophrys stigma =

Scientific classification
- Domain: Eukaryota
- Kingdom: Animalia
- Phylum: Arthropoda
- Class: Insecta
- Order: Lepidoptera
- Family: Tortricidae
- Genus: Cosmiophrys
- Species: C. stigma

Binomial name
- Cosmiophrys stigma Diakonoff, 1960

Species of moth

Cosmiophrys stigma is a species of moth of the family Tortricidae. It is found in Madagascar.
