= Electraglaia isozona =

Scientific classification
- Domain: Eukaryota
- Kingdom: Animalia
- Phylum: Arthropoda
- Class: Insecta
- Order: Lepidoptera
- Family: Tortricidae
- Genus: Electraglaia
- Species: E. isozona

Binomial name
- Electraglaia isozona (Meyrick, 1908)

Synonyms
- Cacoecia isozona Meyrick, 1908; Tortrix segnis Meyrick, 1918

Species of moth

Electraglaia isozona is a moth of the family Tortricidae. It is found in India (Assam, Sikkim), Nepal, China (Yunnan) and Vietnam.
