= Gongylotypa anaetia =

Scientific classification
- Domain: Eukaryota
- Kingdom: Animalia
- Phylum: Arthropoda
- Class: Insecta
- Order: Lepidoptera
- Family: Tortricidae
- Genus: Gongylotypa
- Species: G. anaetia

Binomial name
- Gongylotypa anaetia Diakonoff, 1984

Species of moth

Gongylotypa anaetia is a species of moth of the family Tortricidae. It is found in south-eastern Sulawesi, Indonesia.
