= Furcinula perizoma =

Scientific classification
- Kingdom: Animalia
- Phylum: Arthropoda
- Clade: Pancrustacea
- Class: Insecta
- Order: Lepidoptera
- Family: Tortricidae
- Genus: Furcinula
- Species: F. perizoma

Binomial name
- Furcinula perizoma Diakonoff, 1960

Species of moth

Furcinula perizoma is a species of moth of the family Tortricidae. It is found in Madagascar.
