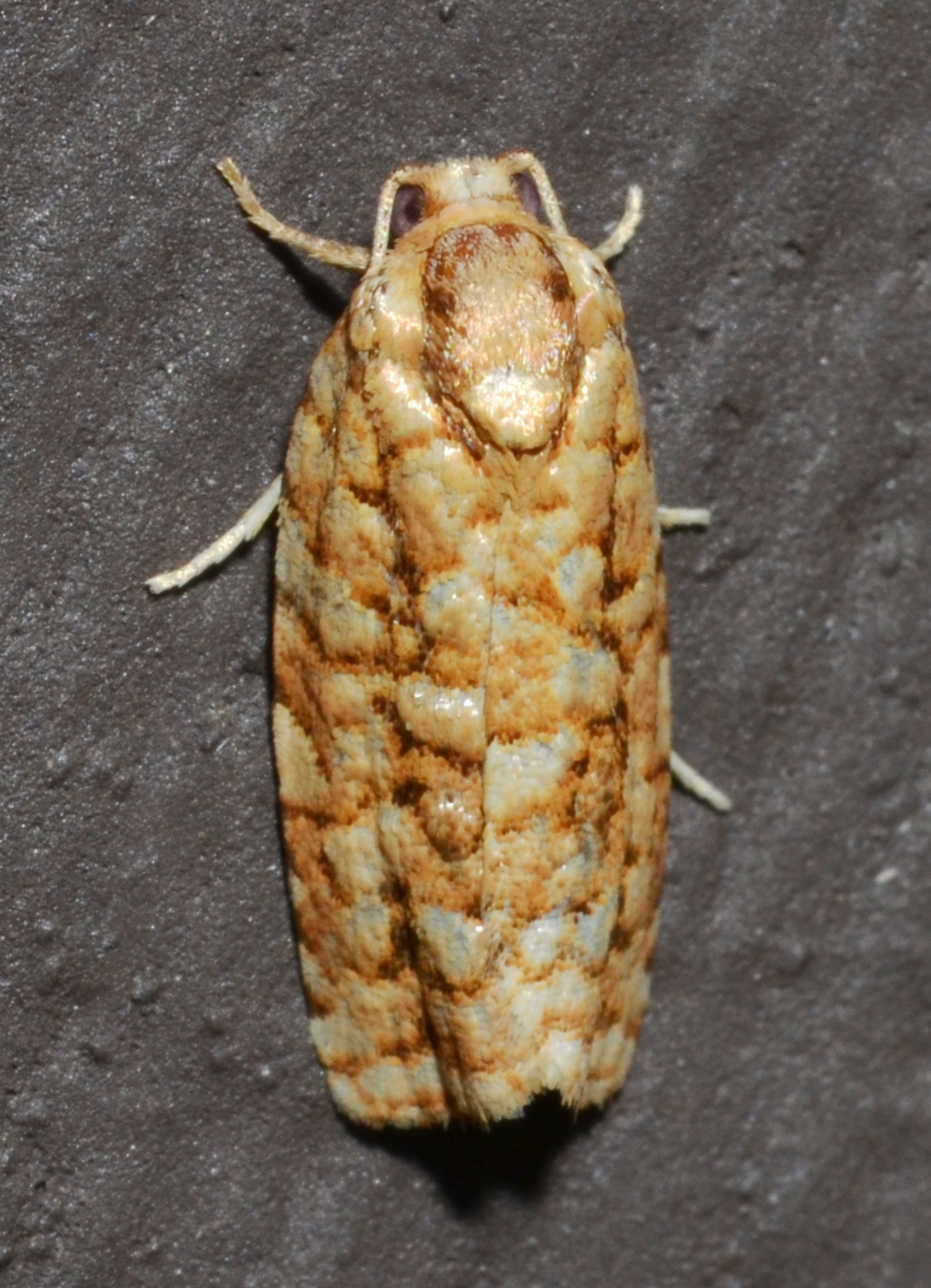
- Cudonigera houstonana

Scientific classification
- Domain: Eukaryota
- Kingdom: Animalia
- Phylum: Arthropoda
- Class: Insecta
- Order: Lepidoptera
- Family: Tortricidae
- Genus: Cudonigera
- Species: C. houstonana

Binomial name
- Cudonigera houstonana (Grote, 1873)

Synonyms
- Tortrix houstonana Grote, 1873; Tortrix retana Walsingham, 1879

= Cudonigera houstonana =

Species of moth

Cudonigera houstonana, the juniper budworm moth, is a species of moth of the family Tortricidae. It is found in North America, where it has been recorded from Arizona, California, Kansas, Mississippi, New Hampshire, New Jersey, New Mexico, North Carolina, Oklahoma, Tennessee and Texas.

The wingspan is about 20 mm. Adults have been recorded on wing from April to November. There are up to two generations per year.

The larvae feed on the foliage of Juniperus ashei.
