= Asteriognatha cyclocentra =

Scientific classification
- Domain: Eukaryota
- Kingdom: Animalia
- Phylum: Arthropoda
- Class: Insecta
- Order: Lepidoptera
- Family: Tortricidae
- Genus: Asteriognatha
- Species: A. cyclocentra

Binomial name
- Asteriognatha cyclocentra Diakonoff, 1983

Species of moth

Asteriognatha cyclocentra is a species of moth of the family Tortricidae. It is found on Sumatra.
