= Electraglaia contracta =

Scientific classification
- Domain: Eukaryota
- Kingdom: Animalia
- Phylum: Arthropoda
- Class: Insecta
- Order: Lepidoptera
- Family: Tortricidae
- Genus: Electraglaia
- Species: E. contracta

Binomial name
- Electraglaia contracta Wang & Li, 2004

Species of moth

Electraglaia contracta is a species of moth of the family Tortricidae. It is found in Guizhou, China.
