= Arizelana bibatrix =

Scientific classification
- Domain: Eukaryota
- Kingdom: Animalia
- Phylum: Arthropoda
- Class: Insecta
- Order: Lepidoptera
- Family: Tortricidae
- Genus: Arizelana
- Species: A. bibatrix

Binomial name
- Arizelana bibatrix Diakonoff, 1953

Species of moth

Arizelana bibatrix is a species of moth of the family Tortricidae. It is found in New Guinea.
