= Pteridoporthis =

Scientific classification
- Kingdom: Animalia
- Phylum: Arthropoda
- Class: Insecta
- Order: Lepidoptera
- Family: Tortricidae
- Tribe: Archipini
- Genus: Pteridoporthis; Meyrick, 1937
- Species: P. euryloxa

Binomial name
- Pteridoporthis euryloxa Meyrick, 1937

Monotypic genus of tortrix moths

Pteridoporthis is a genus of moths belonging to the subfamily Tortricinae of the family Tortricidae. It contains only one species, Pteridoporthis euryloxa, which is found on Fiji.

== See also ==
- List of Tortricidae genera
