= Borneogena antigrapha =

Scientific classification
- Domain: Eukaryota
- Kingdom: Animalia
- Phylum: Arthropoda
- Class: Insecta
- Order: Lepidoptera
- Superfamily: Noctuoidea
- Family: Noctuidae
- Genus: Borneogena
- Species: B. antigrapha

Binomial name
- Borneogena antigrapha Diakonoff, 1941

Species of moth

Borneogena antigrapha is a species of moth of the family Tortricidae. It is found on Borneo.
