= Dicellitis nigritula =

Scientific classification
- Kingdom: Animalia
- Phylum: Arthropoda
- Class: Insecta
- Order: Lepidoptera
- Family: Tortricidae
- Genus: Dicellitis
- Species: D. nigritula

Binomial name
- Dicellitis nigritula Meyrick, 1908

Species of moth

Dicellitis nigritula is a species of moth of the family Tortricidae. It is found in India (Coorg) and Nepal.
