= Dynatocephala omophaea =

Scientific classification
- Domain: Eukaryota
- Kingdom: Animalia
- Phylum: Arthropoda
- Class: Insecta
- Order: Lepidoptera
- Family: Tortricidae
- Genus: Dynatocephala
- Species: D. omophaea

Binomial name
- Dynatocephala omophaea (Meyrick, 1926)

Synonyms
- Harmologa omophaea Meyrick, 1926; Cacoecia cirrhocrossa Meyrick, 1926; Homona cruenta Diakonoff, 1976; Dynatocephala erebenna Diakonoff, 1983

Species of moth

Dynatocephala omophaea is a moth of the family Tortricidae. It is found in Nepal, Sikkim in northern India, Thailand, western Malaysia, Vietnam, Sumatra and Borneo.
