= Electraglaia nigrapex =

Scientific classification
- Domain: Eukaryota
- Kingdom: Animalia
- Phylum: Arthropoda
- Class: Insecta
- Order: Lepidoptera
- Family: Tortricidae
- Genus: Electraglaia
- Species: E. nigrapex

Binomial name
- Electraglaia nigrapex Razowski, 2009

Species of moth

Electraglaia nigrapex is a moth of the family Tortricidae which is endemic to Vietnam.

The wingspan is 15.5 millimetres (0.61 in).
