= Dynatocephala altivola =

Scientific classification
- Domain: Eukaryota
- Kingdom: Animalia
- Phylum: Arthropoda
- Class: Insecta
- Order: Lepidoptera
- Family: Tortricidae
- Genus: Dynatocephala
- Species: D. altivola

Binomial name
- Dynatocephala altivola Razowski, 2009

Species of moth

Dynatocephala altivola is a moth of the family Tortricidae. It is found in Vietnam.
