= Cornuclepsis seminivea =

Scientific classification
- Kingdom: Animalia
- Phylum: Arthropoda
- Clade: Pancrustacea
- Class: Insecta
- Order: Lepidoptera
- Family: Tortricidae
- Genus: Cornuclepsis
- Species: C. seminivea

Binomial name
- Cornuclepsis seminivea Razowski & Becker, 2000

Species of moth

Cornuclepsis seminivea is a species of moth of the family Tortricidae. It is found in Costa Rica.
