= Tortrix cratista =

"Tortrix" cratista

Scientific classification
- Kingdom: Animalia
- Phylum: Arthropoda
- Clade: Pancrustacea
- Class: Insecta
- Order: Lepidoptera
- Family: Tortricidae
- Subfamily: Tortricinae
- Tribe: Archipini
- Genus: incertae sedis
- Species: "T." cratista

Binomial name
- "Tortrix" cratista Walsingham, 1914

Species of moth

"Tortrix" cratista is a species of moth of the family Tortricidae. It is found in Guatemala.

The wingspan is about 17 mm for males and 20 mm for females. The forewings are tawny with an ill-defined dark tawny-brown fascia. The central area of the hindwings is white, and the margins are shaded with brownish fuscous.
