= Leptochroptila =

Scientific classification
- Domain: Eukaryota
- Kingdom: Animalia
- Phylum: Arthropoda
- Class: Insecta
- Order: Lepidoptera
- Family: Tortricidae
- Tribe: Archipini
- Genus: Leptochroptila; Diakonoff, 1939
- Species: L. daratua

Binomial name
- Leptochroptila daratua Diakonoff, 1939

Monotypic genus of tortrix moths

Leptochroptila is a genus of moths belonging to the subfamily Tortricinae of the family Tortricidae. It contains only one species, Leptochroptila daratua, which is found in New Guinea.

== See also ==
- List of Tortricidae genera
