= Bactrostoma =

Scientific classification
- Domain: Eukaryota
- Kingdom: Animalia
- Phylum: Arthropoda
- Class: Insecta
- Order: Lepidoptera
- Family: Tortricidae
- Tribe: Archipini
- Genus: Bactrostoma; Diakonoff, 1960

Genus of tortrix moths

Bactrostoma is a genus of moths belonging to the subfamily Olethreutinae of the family Tortricidae.

== Species ==
- Bactrostoma cinis Diakonoff, 1960

== See also ==
- List of Tortricidae genera
