= Cryptomelaena =

Scientific classification
- Domain: Eukaryota
- Kingdom: Animalia
- Phylum: Arthropoda
- Class: Insecta
- Order: Lepidoptera
- Family: Tortricidae
- Tribe: Archipini
- Genus: Cryptomelaena; Diakonoff, 1983

Genus of tortrix moths

Cryptomelaena is a genus of moths belonging to the family Tortricidae.

== Species ==
- Cryptomelaena dynastes Diakonoff, 1983

== See also ==
- List of Tortricidae genera
