= Electraglaia caementosa =

Scientific classification
- Domain: Eukaryota
- Kingdom: Animalia
- Phylum: Arthropoda
- Class: Insecta
- Order: Lepidoptera
- Family: Tortricidae
- Genus: Electraglaia
- Species: E. caementosa

Binomial name
- Electraglaia caementosa (Meyrick, 1908)

Synonyms
- Cacoecia caementosa Meyrick, 1908

Species of moth

Electraglaia caementosa is a species of moth of the family Tortricidae. It is found in Assam, India.
