= Dicanticinta =

Scientific classification
- Kingdom: Animalia
- Phylum: Arthropoda
- Clade: Pancrustacea
- Class: Insecta
- Order: Lepidoptera
- Family: Tortricidae
- Tribe: Archipini
- Genus: Dicanticinta; Yasuda & Razowski, 1991

Genus of tortrix moths

Dicanticinta is a genus of moths belonging to the family Tortricidae.

== Species ==
- Dicanticinta diticinctana (Walsingham, 1900)

== See also ==
- List of Tortricidae genera
