= Phaenacropista cremnotoma =

Scientific classification
- Kingdom: Animalia
- Phylum: Arthropoda
- Class: Insecta
- Order: Lepidoptera
- Family: Tortricidae
- Genus: Phaenacropista
- Species: P. cremnotoma

Binomial name
- Phaenacropista cremnotoma (Meyrick, 1936)

Synonyms
- Schoenotenes cremnotoma Meyrick, 1936

Species of moth

Phaenacropista cremnotoma is a species of moth of the family Tortricidae. It is found on Java in Indonesia.
