= Aphthonocosma plutarcha =

Scientific classification
- Domain: Eukaryota
- Kingdom: Animalia
- Phylum: Arthropoda
- Class: Insecta
- Order: Lepidoptera
- Family: Tortricidae
- Genus: Aphthonocosma
- Species: A. plutarcha

Binomial name
- Aphthonocosma plutarcha Diakonoff, 1953

Species of moth

Aphthonocosma plutarcha is a species of moth of the family Tortricidae, which is found in New Guinea.
