= Furcataenia cholosaccula =

Scientific classification
- Kingdom: Animalia
- Phylum: Arthropoda
- Clade: Pancrustacea
- Class: Insecta
- Order: Lepidoptera
- Family: Tortricidae
- Genus: Furcataenia
- Species: F. cholosaccula

Binomial name
- Furcataenia cholosaccula Razowski & Becker, 2000

Species of moth

Furcataenia cholosaccula is a species of moth of the family Tortricidae. It is found in Alagoas, Brazil.
