= Cununcus phylarchus =

Scientific classification
- Kingdom: Animalia
- Phylum: Arthropoda
- Clade: Pancrustacea
- Class: Insecta
- Order: Lepidoptera
- Family: Tortricidae
- Genus: Cudonigera
- Species: C. phylarchus

Binomial name
- Cudonigera phylarchus Razowski & Becker, 2000

Species of moth

Cununcus phylarchus is a species of moth of the family Tortricidae. It is found in Paraná, Brazil.
