= Ancyroclepsis rhodoconia =

Scientific classification
- Domain: Eukaryota
- Kingdom: Animalia
- Phylum: Arthropoda
- Class: Insecta
- Order: Lepidoptera
- Family: Tortricidae
- Genus: Ancyroclepsis
- Species: A. rhodoconia

Binomial name
- Ancyroclepsis rhodoconia Diakonoff, 1976

Species of moth

Ancyroclepsis rhodoconia is a moth of the family Tortricidae. It is found in Nepal, China (Likiang) and Vietnam.
