= Gephyraspis =

Scientific classification
- Domain: Eukaryota
- Kingdom: Animalia
- Phylum: Arthropoda
- Class: Insecta
- Order: Lepidoptera
- Family: Tortricidae
- Tribe: Archipini
- Genus: Gephyraspis; Diakonoff, 1960

Genus of tortrix moths

Gephyraspis is a genus of moths belonging to the family Tortricidae.

== Species ==
- Gephyraspis contranota Diakonoff, 1973
- Gephyraspis insolita Diakonoff, 1973
- Gephyraspis lutescens Diakonoff, 1960

== See also ==
- List of Tortricidae genera
