= Kanikehia =

Scientific classification
- Kingdom: Animalia
- Phylum: Arthropoda
- Class: Insecta
- Order: Lepidoptera
- Family: Tortricidae
- Tribe: Archipini
- Genus: Kanikehia; Razowski, 2013
- Species: K. kanikehiana

Binomial name
- Kanikehia kanikehiana Razowski, 2013

Genus of moths

Kanikehia is a monotypic moth genus of the family Tortricidae. Its only species, Kanikehia kanikehiana, is found on Seram Island in Indonesia. Both the genus and species were first described by Józef Razowski in 2013. The habitat consists of bamboo and secondary forests at altitudes of about 850 meters.

The wingspan is about 12 mm.

== Etymology ==
The genus name is based on the type locality of the type species. The specific name also refers to the type locality, Kanikeh.
