= Sychnochlaena =

Scientific classification
- Domain: Eukaryota
- Kingdom: Animalia
- Phylum: Arthropoda
- Class: Insecta
- Order: Lepidoptera
- Family: Tortricidae
- Tribe: Archipini
- Genus: Sychnochlaena; Diakonoff, 1982
- Species: S. megalorhis

Binomial name
- Sychnochlaena megalorhis Diakonoff, 1982

Monotypic genus of tortrix moths

Sychnochlaena is a monotypic moth genus belonging to the family Tortricidae first described by Alexey Diakonoff in 1982. Its only species, Sychnochlaena megalorhis, described by the same author in the same year, is found in Sri Lanka.

== Description ==
The wingspan of the adult female is 14.5 mm. Its head and palpus are light tawny. Palpus long and porrect (extending forward). Antennae subserrulate in female. Antenna light tawny. Thorax deep tawny with a posterior large, erect, blackish tuft. Abdomen glossy gray. Thorax with a large erect posterior crest. In forewing, anterior half is tawny grayish with olive suffusion. Costa with slender, vertical dark lines. There are two fuscous spots in cell. Cilia pale orange at apex and fuscous in tornus. Hindwings bronze grayish. They are semi-pellucent, becoming whitish and more transparent basally. Cilia dark bronze fuscous, with a pale basal band.

== See also ==
- List of Tortricidae genera
