= Cosmiophrys =

Scientific classification
- Domain: Eukaryota
- Kingdom: Animalia
- Phylum: Arthropoda
- Class: Insecta
- Order: Lepidoptera
- Family: Tortricidae
- Tribe: Archipini
- Genus: Cosmiophrys; Diakonoff, 1960

Genus of tortrix moths

Cosmiophrys is a genus of moths belonging to the subfamily Tortricinae of the family Tortricidae.

== Species ==
- Cosmiophrys chrysobola Diakonoff, 1970
- Cosmiophrys stigma Diakonoff, 1960

== See also ==
- List of Tortricidae genera
