= Durangarchips druana =

Scientific classification
- Domain: Eukaryota
- Kingdom: Animalia
- Phylum: Arthropoda
- Class: Insecta
- Order: Lepidoptera
- Family: Tortricidae
- Genus: Durangarchips
- Species: D. druana

Binomial name
- Durangarchips druana (Walsingham, 1914)

Synonyms
- Tortrix druana Walsingham, 1914

Species of moth

Durangarchips druana is a species of moth of the family Tortricidae. It is found in Durango, Mexico.
