= Petridia =

Scientific classification
- Domain: Eukaryota
- Kingdom: Animalia
- Phylum: Arthropoda
- Class: Insecta
- Order: Lepidoptera
- Family: Tortricidae
- Tribe: Archipini
- Genus: Petridia; Diakonoff, 1983
- Species: P. latypos

Binomial name
- Petridia latypos Diakonoff, 1983

Monotypic genus of tortrix moths

Petridia is a genus of moths belonging to the family Tortricidae. It contains only one species, Petridia latypos, which is found on Sumatra.

== See also ==
- List of Tortricidae genera
