= Egogepa crassata =

Scientific classification
- Domain: Eukaryota
- Kingdom: Animalia
- Phylum: Arthropoda
- Class: Insecta
- Order: Lepidoptera
- Family: Tortricidae
- Genus: Egogepa
- Species: E. crassata

Binomial name
- Egogepa crassata Wang & Li, 2006

Species of moth

Egogepa crassata is a species of moth of the family Tortricidae. It is found in Tibet.
