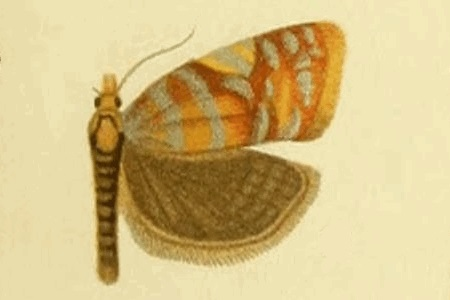

Scientific classification
- Domain: Eukaryota
- Kingdom: Animalia
- Phylum: Arthropoda
- Class: Insecta
- Order: Lepidoptera
- Family: Tortricidae
- Subfamily: Tortricinae
- Tribe: Archipini
- Genus: Abrepagoge; Razowski, 1992
- Species: A. treitschkeana

Binomial name
- Abrepagoge treitschkeana (Treitschke, 1835)

Synonyms
- Tortrix treitschkeana (Treitschke, 1835); Epagoge osmangasii (Koçak, 1986)

= Abrepagoge =

Monotypic genus of tortrix moths

Abrepagoge is a monotypic genus of tortrix moths belonging to tribe Archipini of the subfamily Tortricinae. It was described in 1992 by Józef Razowski.

Its sole species, Abrepagoge treitschkeana, was described (as Tortrix treitschkeana) in 1835 by Georg Friedrich Treitschke in Die Schmetterlinge von Europa 10 (3).

Abrepagoge treitschkeana is known from Eastern Europe: it has been recorded in Bulgaria, Romania, Ukraine and European Russia.

== See also ==
- List of Tortricidae genera
