= Platyhomonopsis =

Scientific classification
- Domain: Eukaryota
- Kingdom: Animalia
- Phylum: Arthropoda
- Class: Insecta
- Order: Lepidoptera
- Family: Tortricidae
- Tribe: Archipini
- Genus: Platyhomonopsis; Wang & Li, 2005
- Species: P. dentata

Binomial name
- Platyhomonopsis dentata Wang & Li, 2005

Monotypic genus of tortrix moths

Platyhomonopsis is a genus of moths belonging to the family Tortricidae. It contains only one species, Platyhomonopsis dentata, which is found in China (Guizhou).

== See also ==
- List of Tortricidae genera
