= Furcinula =

Scientific classification
- Domain: Eukaryota
- Kingdom: Animalia
- Phylum: Arthropoda
- Class: Insecta
- Order: Lepidoptera
- Family: Tortricidae
- Tribe: Archipini
- Genus: Furcinula; Diakonoff, 1960

Synonyms
- Furnicula Razowski, 2004

Genus of tortrix moths

Furcinula is a genus of moths belonging to the subfamily Tortricinae of the family Tortricidae.

== Species ==
- Furcinula perizoma Diakonoff, 1960
- Furcinula punctulata Diakonoff, 1960

== See also ==
- List of Tortricidae genera
