= Tortrix celatrix =

"Tortrix" celatrix

Scientific classification
- Kingdom: Animalia
- Phylum: Arthropoda
- Clade: Pancrustacea
- Class: Insecta
- Order: Lepidoptera
- Family: Tortricidae
- Subfamily: Tortricinae
- Tribe: Archipini
- Genus: incertae sedis
- Species: "T." celatrix

Binomial name
- "Tortrix" celatrix Turner, 1916

Synonyms
- Rupicolana celatrix

Species of moth

"Tortrix" celatrix is a species of moth of the family Tortricidae. It is found in Australia, where it has been recorded from Queensland.

The wingspan is 19–20 mm. The forewings are dark fuscous-brown, finely strigulated with reddish-brown, but the costal edge strigulated with fuscous. The hindwings are whitish, strigulated with grey.
