= Josefrazowskia =

Scientific classification
- Kingdom: Animalia
- Phylum: Arthropoda
- Class: Insecta
- Order: Lepidoptera
- Family: Tortricidae
- Tribe: Archipini
- Genus: Josefrazowskia; Kocak & Kemal, 2008
- Species: J. recondita

Binomial name
- Josefrazowskia recondita (Razowski, 2006)

Synonyms
- Worcesteria Razowski, 2006 (preocc.); Worcesteria recondita Razowski, 2006

Genus of moths

Josefrazowskia is a genus of moths of the family Tortricidae. It contains only one species, Josefrazowskia recondita, which is found in South Africa.

== Etymology ==
The genus name refers to Worcester, the type locality of the type-species. The species name refers to the separate systematic position of the species within the Archipini tribe and is derived from Latin recorndita (meaning well distanced).

== See also ==
- List of Tortricidae genera
