= Borneogena siniaevi =

Scientific classification
- Domain: Eukaryota
- Kingdom: Animalia
- Phylum: Arthropoda
- Class: Insecta
- Order: Lepidoptera
- Superfamily: Noctuoidea
- Family: Noctuidae
- Genus: Borneogena
- Species: B. siniaevi

Binomial name
- Borneogena siniaevi Razowski, 2009

Species of moth

Borneogena siniaevi is a moth of the family Tortricidae. It is found in Vietnam. The wingspan is 22 mm.
