= Pyrsarcha =

Scientific classification
- Kingdom: Animalia
- Phylum: Arthropoda
- Class: Insecta
- Order: Lepidoptera
- Family: Tortricidae
- Tribe: Archipini
- Genus: Pyrsarcha; Meyrick, 1932
- Species: P. hypsicrates

Binomial name
- Pyrsarcha hypsicrates Meyrick, 1932

Genus of tortrix moths

Pyrsarcha is a genus of moths belonging to the subfamily Tortricinae of the family Tortricidae. It contains only one species, Pyrsarcha hypsicrates, which is found in Kashmir.

== See also ==
- List of Tortricidae genera
