= Mantua fulvosericea =

Scientific classification
- Domain: Eukaryota
- Kingdom: Animalia
- Phylum: Arthropoda
- Class: Insecta
- Order: Lepidoptera
- Family: Tortricidae
- Subfamily: Tortricinae
- Tribe: Archipini
- Genus: Mantua; Zimmerman, 1978
- Species: M. fulvosericea

Binomial name
- Mantua fulvosericea (Walsingham in Sharp, 1907)

Synonyms
- Dipterina fulvosericea Walsingham in Sharp, 1907; Cnephasia fulvosericea

Species of moth

Mantua is a monotypic moth genus belonging to the subfamily Tortricinae of the family Tortricidae. The genus was first described by Elwood Zimmerman in 1978. Its only species, Mantua fulvosericea, was first described by Lord Walsingham in 1907. It is endemic to the Hawaiian islands of Kauai, Oahu, Molokai and Lanai.

The wingspan is 28–36 mm.

The larvae feed on Xylosma hawaiensis. They spin the leaves together.

== See also ==
- List of Tortricidae genera
