= Durangarchips =

Scientific classification
- Kingdom: Animalia
- Phylum: Arthropoda
- Clade: Pancrustacea
- Class: Insecta
- Order: Lepidoptera
- Family: Tortricidae
- Tribe: Archipini
- Genus: Durangarchips; Powell, 1995

Genus of tortrix moths

Durangarchips is a genus of moths belonging to the family Tortricidae.

== Species ==
- Durangarchips druana (Walsingham, 1914)

== See also ==
- List of Tortricidae genera
