= Allodemis chelophora =

Scientific classification
- Domain: Eukaryota
- Kingdom: Animalia
- Phylum: Arthropoda
- Class: Insecta
- Order: Lepidoptera
- Family: Tortricidae
- Genus: Allodemis
- Species: A. chelophora

Binomial name
- Allodemis chelophora (Meyrick, 1910)

Synonyms
- Procalyptis chelophora Meyrick, 1910

Species of moth

Allodemis chelophora is a species of moth of the family Tortricidae. It is found on Peninsular Malaysia.
