= Midaellobes =

Scientific classification
- Kingdom: Animalia
- Phylum: Arthropoda
- Class: Insecta
- Order: Lepidoptera
- Family: Tortricidae
- Tribe: Archipini
- Genus: Midaellobes; Viette, 1990
- Species: M. rubrostrigana

Binomial name
- Midaellobes rubrostrigana (Mabille, 1900)

Synonyms
- Mabilleodes Diakonoff, 1960 (preocc.); Tortrix rubrostrigana Mabille, 1900; Mabilleodes rubrostrigana

Monotypic genus of tortrix moths

Midaellobes is a genus of moths belonging to the subfamily Tortricinae of the family Tortricidae. It contains only one species, Midaellobes rubrostrigana, which is found in Madagascar.

Larvae have been recorded feeding on an unidentified Euphorbiaceae species.

== See also ==
- List of Tortricidae genera
