= Allodemis euhelias =

Scientific classification
- Domain: Eukaryota
- Kingdom: Animalia
- Phylum: Arthropoda
- Class: Insecta
- Order: Lepidoptera
- Family: Tortricidae
- Genus: Allodemis
- Species: A. euhelias

Binomial name
- Allodemis euhelias Diakonoff, 1983

Species of moth

Allodemis euhelias is a species of moth of the family Tortricidae. It is found on Sumatra.
