= Ceritaenia ceria =

Scientific classification
- Kingdom: Animalia
- Phylum: Arthropoda
- Clade: Pancrustacea
- Class: Insecta
- Order: Lepidoptera
- Family: Tortricidae
- Genus: Ceritaenia
- Species: C. ceria

Binomial name
- Ceritaenia ceria Razowski & Becker, 2000

Species of moth

Ceritaenia ceria is a species of moth of the family Tortricidae. It is found in Rio Grande do Sul, Brazil.
