= Diactora oxymorpha =

Scientific classification
- Domain: Eukaryota
- Kingdom: Animalia
- Phylum: Arthropoda
- Class: Insecta
- Order: Lepidoptera
- Family: Tortricidae
- Genus: Diactora
- Species: D. oxymorpha

Binomial name
- Diactora oxymorpha Diakonoff, 1960

Species of moth

Diactora oxymorpha is a species of moth of the family Tortricidae. It is found in Madagascar.
