= Dicellitis furcigera =

Scientific classification
- Kingdom: Animalia
- Phylum: Arthropoda
- Class: Insecta
- Order: Lepidoptera
- Family: Tortricidae
- Genus: Dicellitis
- Species: D. furcigera

Binomial name
- Dicellitis furcigera Meyrick, 1928

Species of moth

Dicellitis furcigera is a species of moth of the family Tortricidae. It is found in Papua New Guinea.
