= Ceramea singularis =

Scientific classification
- Domain: Eukaryota
- Kingdom: Animalia
- Phylum: Arthropoda
- Class: Insecta
- Order: Lepidoptera
- Family: Tortricidae
- Genus: Ceramea
- Species: C. singularis

Binomial name
- Ceramea singularis Diakonoff, 1951

Species of moth

Ceramea singularis is a species of moth of the family Tortricidae. It is found in Myanmar.
