= Raisapoana =

Scientific classification
- Kingdom: Animalia
- Phylum: Arthropoda
- Clade: Pancrustacea
- Class: Insecta
- Order: Lepidoptera
- Family: Tortricidae
- Tribe: Archipini
- Genus: Raisapoana; Razowski & Becker, 2010
- Species: R. paraisoana

Binomial name
- Raisapoana paraisoana Razowski & Becker, 2010

Genus of moths

Raisapoana is a genus of moths of the family Tortricidae. It contains only one species, Raisapoana paraisoana, which is found in Goiás, Brazil.
