= Exorstaenia festiva =

Scientific classification
- Kingdom: Animalia
- Phylum: Arthropoda
- Clade: Pancrustacea
- Class: Insecta
- Order: Lepidoptera
- Family: Tortricidae
- Genus: Exorstaenia
- Species: E. festiva

Binomial name
- Exorstaenia festiva Razowski & Becker, 2000

Species of moth

Exorstaenia festiva is a species of moth of the family Tortricidae. It is found in Santa Catarina, Brazil.
