= Phalarotortrix =

Scientific classification
- Domain: Eukaryota
- Kingdom: Animalia
- Phylum: Arthropoda
- Class: Insecta
- Order: Lepidoptera
- Family: Tortricidae
- Tribe: Archipini
- Genus: Phalarotortrix; Razowski, 2015

Genus of moths

Phalarotortrix is a genus of moths belonging to the subfamily Tortricinae of the family Tortricidae. Both species in the genus were originally described in Cnephasia.

== Species ==
- Phalarotortrix phalarocosma (Meyrick, 1937)
- Phalarotortrix ergastularis (Meyrick, 1911)

== See also ==
- List of Tortricidae genera
