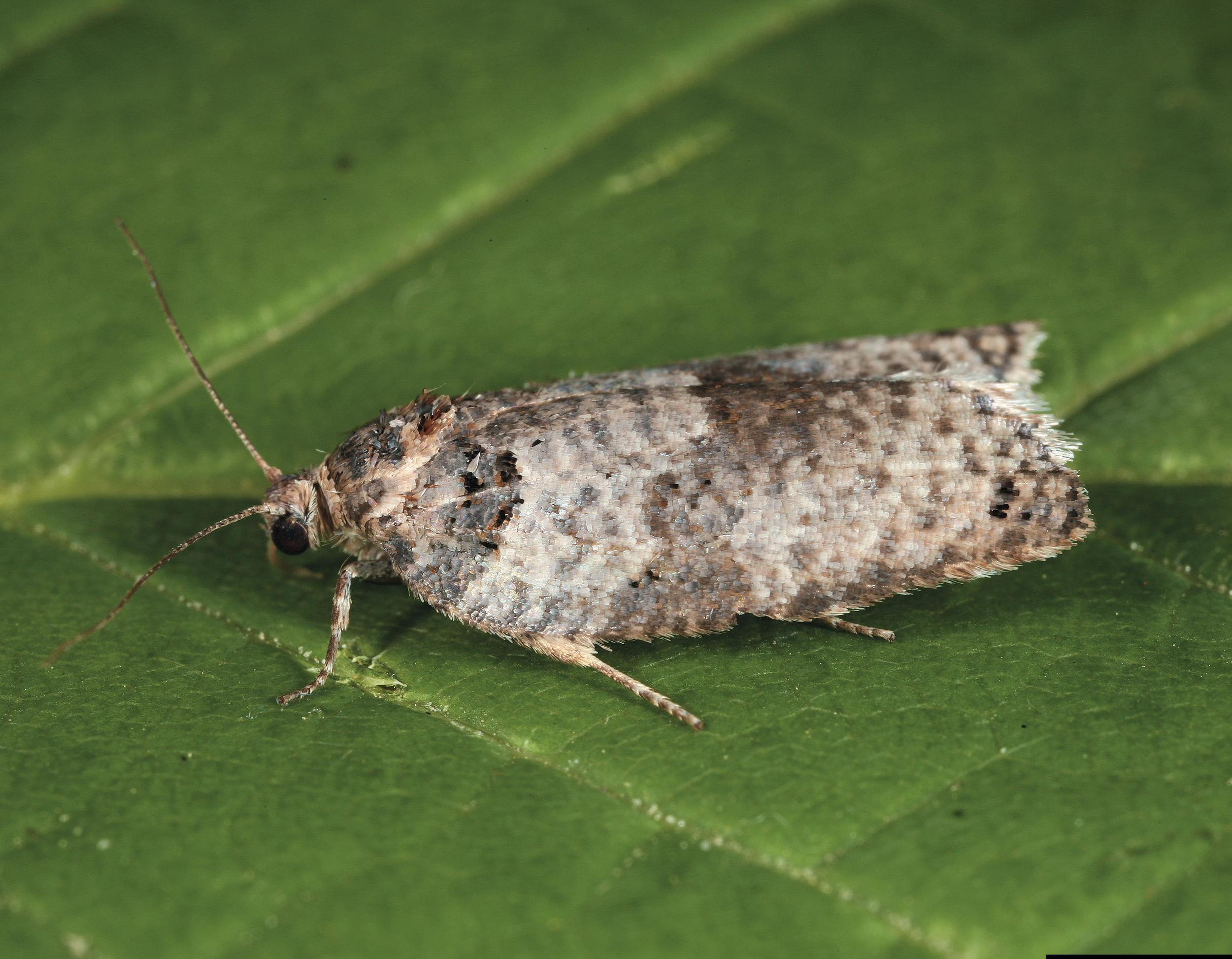

Scientific classification
- Domain: Eukaryota
- Kingdom: Animalia
- Phylum: Arthropoda
- Class: Insecta
- Order: Lepidoptera
- Family: Tortricidae
- Tribe: Archipini
- Genus: Pseudeulia; Obraztsov, 1954
- Species: P. asinana

Binomial name
- Pseudeulia asinana (Hubner, [1796-1799])

Synonyms
- Pseudeulia asinana (Hubner, 1799); Tortrix asinana Hubner, 1799; Cnephasia assinana Stephens, 1829; Philedonides magnata Yasuda, 1957; Philedone vermicularis Meyrick, in Caradja & Meyrick, 1935

= Pseudeulia =

Monotypic genus of tortrix moths

Pseudeulia is a genus of moths belonging to the subfamily Tortricinae of the family Tortricidae. It contains only one species, Pseudeulia asinana, which is found in Italy, Slovenia, Austria, the Czech Republic, Slovakia, Hungary, Romania, Bulgaria, North Macedonia and Ukraine.

The wingspan is 23–28 mm. Adults are on wing from April to May in one generation per year.

The larvae feed on Laurus nobilis and Pyrus species.

== See also ==
- List of Tortricidae genera
