= Dicellitis cornucopiae =

Scientific classification
- Domain: Eukaryota
- Kingdom: Animalia
- Phylum: Arthropoda
- Class: Insecta
- Order: Lepidoptera
- Family: Tortricidae
- Genus: Dicellitis
- Species: D. cornucopiae

Binomial name
- Dicellitis cornucopiae Diakonoff, 1941

Species of moth

Dicellitis cornucopiae is a species of moth of the family Tortricidae. It is found on the Maluku Islands of Indonesia.
