= Electraglaia =

Scientific classification
- Kingdom: Animalia
- Phylum: Arthropoda
- Class: Insecta
- Order: Lepidoptera
- Family: Tortricidae
- Tribe: Archipini
- Genus: Electraglaia; Diakonoff, 1976

Genus of tortrix moths

Electraglaia is a genus of moths belonging to the subfamily Tortricinae of the family Tortricidae.

== Species ==
- Electraglaia caementosa (Meyrick, 1908)
- Electraglaia contracta Wang & Li, 2004
- Electraglaia isozona (Meyrick, 1908)
- Electraglaia nigrapex Razowski, 2009
- Electraglaia robusta Wang & Li, 2004

== See also ==
- List of Tortricidae genera
