= Allodemis pullatana =

Scientific classification
- Domain: Eukaryota
- Kingdom: Animalia
- Phylum: Arthropoda
- Class: Insecta
- Order: Lepidoptera
- Family: Tortricidae
- Genus: Allodemis
- Species: A. pullatana

Binomial name
- Allodemis pullatana (Snellen, 1902)

Synonyms
- Tortrix pullatana Snellen, 1902

Species of moth

Allodemis pullatana is a species of moth of the family Tortricidae. It is found on Java.
