= Egogepa =

Scientific classification
- Kingdom: Animalia
- Phylum: Arthropoda
- Class: Insecta
- Order: Lepidoptera
- Family: Tortricidae
- Tribe: Archipini
- Genus: Egogepa; Razowski, 1977

Genus of tortrix moths

Egogepa is a genus of moths belonging to the subfamily Tortricinae of the family Tortricidae.

== Species ==
- Egogepa crassata Wang & Li, 2006
- Egogepa zosta Razowski, 1977

== See also ==
- List of Tortricidae genera
