= Ancyroclepsis =

Scientific classification
- Domain: Eukaryota
- Kingdom: Animalia
- Phylum: Arthropoda
- Class: Insecta
- Order: Lepidoptera
- Family: Tortricidae
- Tribe: Archipini
- Genus: Ancyroclepsis; Diakonoff, 1976

Genus of tortrix moths

Ancyroclepsis is a genus of moths belonging to the subfamily Tortricinae of the family Tortricidae.

== Species ==
- Ancyroclepsis nakhasathieni Tuck, 1995
- Ancyroclepsis rhodoconia Diakonoff, 1976

== See also ==
- List of Tortricidae genera
