= Ceramea =

Scientific classification
- Kingdom: Animalia
- Phylum: Arthropoda
- Class: Insecta
- Order: Lepidoptera
- Family: Tortricidae
- Tribe: Archipini
- Genus: Ceramea; Diakonoff, 1951

Genus of tortrix moths

Ceramea is a genus of moths belonging to the subfamily Tortricinae of the family Tortricidae.

== Species ==
- Ceramea brunneica Razowski, 2008
- Ceramea singularis Diakonoff, 1951

== See also ==
- List of Tortricidae genera
