= Notioclepsis =

Scientific classification
- Domain: Eukaryota
- Kingdom: Animalia
- Phylum: Arthropoda
- Class: Insecta
- Order: Lepidoptera
- Family: Tortricidae
- Tribe: Archipini
- Genus: Notioclepsis; Diakonoff, 1983
- Species: N. synnoa

Binomial name
- Notioclepsis synnoa Diakonoff, 1983

Monotypic genus of tortrix moths

Notioclepsis is a monotypic genus of moths belonging to the subfamily Tortricinae of the family Tortricidae. It contains only one species, Notioclepsis synnoa, which is found on Sumatra.

== See also ==
- List of Tortricidae genera
