= Saetotaenia =

Scientific classification
- Kingdom: Animalia
- Phylum: Arthropoda
- Clade: Pancrustacea
- Class: Insecta
- Order: Lepidoptera
- Family: Tortricidae
- Tribe: Archipini
- Genus: Saetotaenia; Razowski & Becker, 2000
- Species: S. velitans

Binomial name
- Saetotaenia velitans (Meyrick, 1923)

Synonyms
- Tortrix velitans Meyrick, 1923

Monotypic genus of tortrix moths

Saetotaenia is a genus of moths belonging to the family Tortricidae. It contains only one species, Saetotaenia velitans, which is found in Brazil.

The wingspan is about 15 mm.

== See also ==
- List of Tortricidae genera
