= Ceramea brunneica =

Scientific classification
- Domain: Eukaryota
- Kingdom: Animalia
- Phylum: Arthropoda
- Class: Insecta
- Order: Lepidoptera
- Family: Tortricidae
- Genus: Ceramea
- Species: C. brunneica

Binomial name
- Ceramea brunneica Razowski, 2008

Species of moth

Ceramea brunneica is a species of moth of the family Tortricidae. It is found in Brunei.

The wingspan is about 18 mm.
