= Leucotenes =

Scientific classification
- Domain: Eukaryota
- Kingdom: Animalia
- Phylum: Arthropoda
- Class: Insecta
- Order: Lepidoptera
- Family: Tortricidae
- Tribe: Euliini
- Genus: Leucotenes; Dugdale, 1990

Genus of tortrix moths

Leucotenes is a genus of moths belonging to the family Tortricidae.

== Species ==
- Leucotenes coprosmae (Dugdale, 1988)

== Etymology ==
The genus name is derived from the Greek leukos (meaning white) and tenes, a conventional suffix for tortricids.

== See also ==
- List of Tortricidae genera
