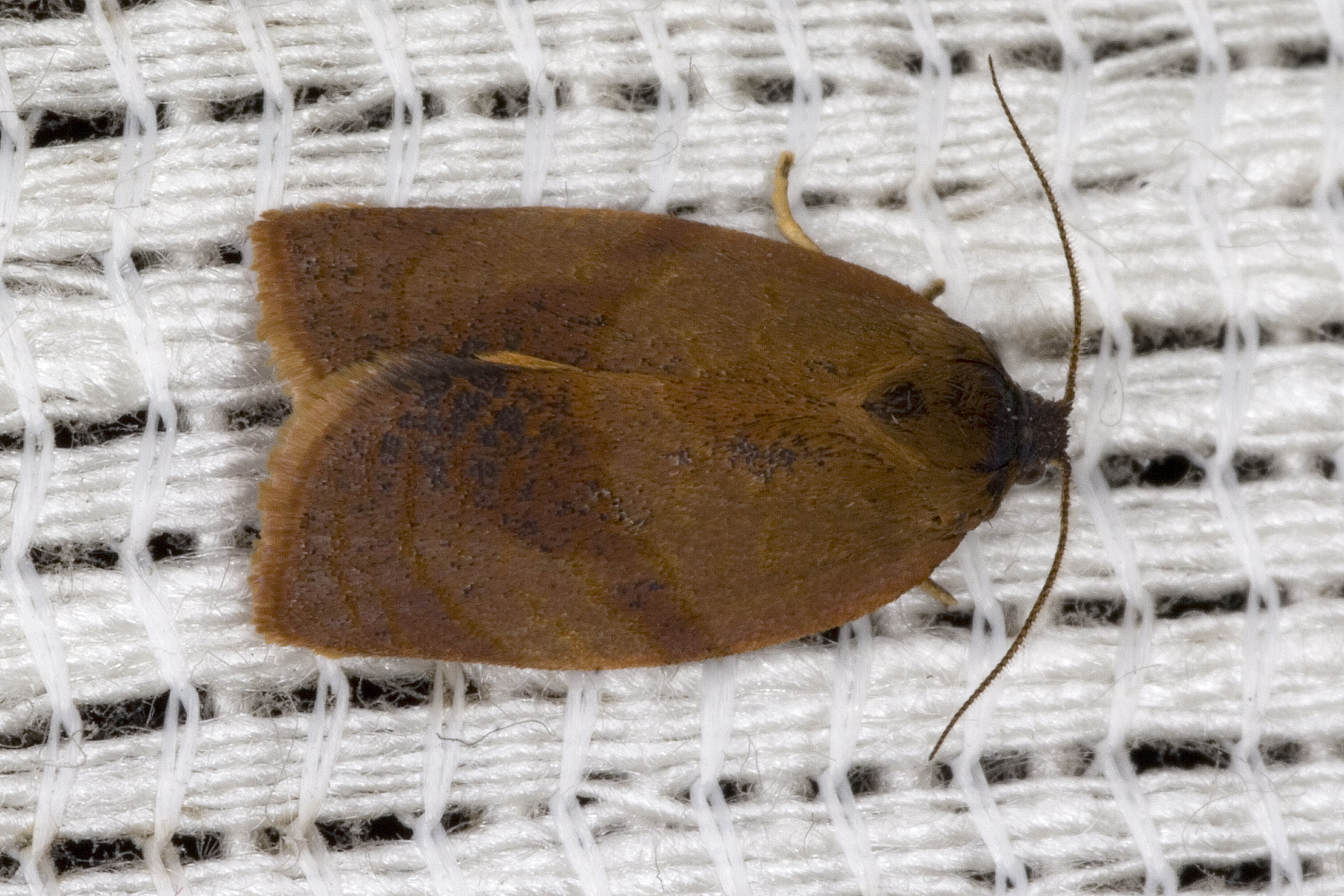

Scientific classification
- Kingdom: Animalia
- Phylum: Arthropoda
- Clade: Pancrustacea
- Class: Insecta
- Order: Lepidoptera
- Family: Tortricidae
- Genus: Cacoecimorpha; Obraztsov, 1954
- Species: C. pronubana

Binomial name
- Cacoecimorpha pronubana (Hübner, 1799)

Synonyms
- List: Tortrix pronubana Hübner, [1796-1799]; Tortrix ambustana Frolich, in Geyer & Hübner, 1830; Tortrix hermineana Duponchel, in Godart, 1834; Tortrix herminiana Duponchel, in Godart, 1834; Tortrix insolatana Lucas, 1848; Tortrix musculana obsoletana Strand, 1901 (form); Tortrix perochreana Herrich-Schäffer, 1856

= Cacoecimorpha =

Cacoecimorpha pronubana

Monotypic genus of tortrix moths

Cacoecimorpha is a monotypic moth genus of the family Tortricidae. Cacoecimorpha pronubana—the carnation tortrix—is its sole species and is found in Europe, northern Africa, South Africa, Anatolia and North America.

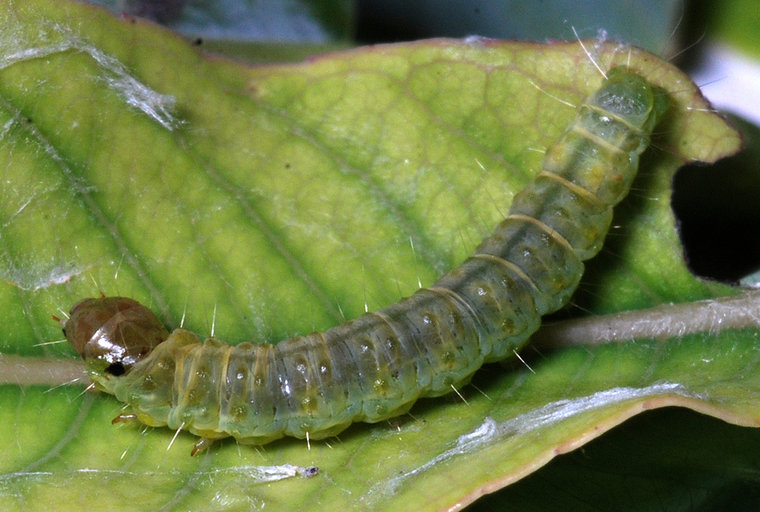
Larva

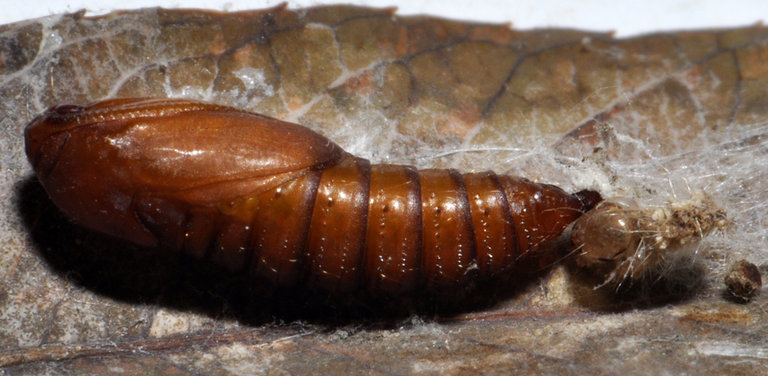
Pupa

The wingspan is 18–22 mm for females and 15–17 mm for males. The forewings ground colour is light reddish ochreous with darker lines. The forewing costa is rounded. The hindwings are bright orange. Julius von Kennel provides a full description.

Adults are on wing from May to June and again from August to September depending on the location.

The larvae feed on a wide variety of deciduous trees, shrubs and herbaceous plants. It can become a pest on olive trees and avocados.
