= Sorensenata =

Scientific classification
- Domain: Eukaryota
- Kingdom: Animalia
- Phylum: Arthropoda
- Class: Insecta
- Order: Lepidoptera
- Family: Tortricidae
- Subfamily: Tortricinae
- Genus: Sorensenata; Salmon & Bradley, 1956
- Species: S. agilitata

Binomial name
- Sorensenata agilitata Salmon & Bradley, 1956

Monotypic genus of tortrix moths

Sorensenata is a genus of moths belonging to the subfamily Tortricinae of the family Tortricidae. It contains only one species, Sorensenata agilitata, Sorenson's agile moth, which is found in New Zealand, where it has been recorded from Campbell Island.

The wingspan of the males is 18 mm. Adults have been recorded in September and October.

The larvae possibly feed on Poa litorosa.
