= Capua tetraplasia =

Scientific classification
- Domain: Eukaryota
- Kingdom: Animalia
- Phylum: Arthropoda
- Class: Insecta
- Order: Lepidoptera
- Family: Tortricidae
- Genus: Capua
- Species: C. tetraplasia

Binomial name
- Capua tetraplasia Turner, 1916

Species of moth

"Capua" tetraplasia is a species of moth of the family Tortricidae. It is found in Australia, where it has been recorded from Queensland.

The wingspan is about 11 mm.
