= Cudonigera =

Scientific classification
- Kingdom: Animalia
- Phylum: Arthropoda
- Clade: Pancrustacea
- Class: Insecta
- Order: Lepidoptera
- Family: Tortricidae
- Tribe: Archipini
- Genus: Cudonigera; Obraztsov & Powell, 1977

Genus of tortrix moths

Cudonigera is a genus of moths of the family Tortricidae and the tribe Archipini.

== Species ==
- Cudonigera houstonana (Grote, 1873)

== See also ==
- List of Tortricidae genera
