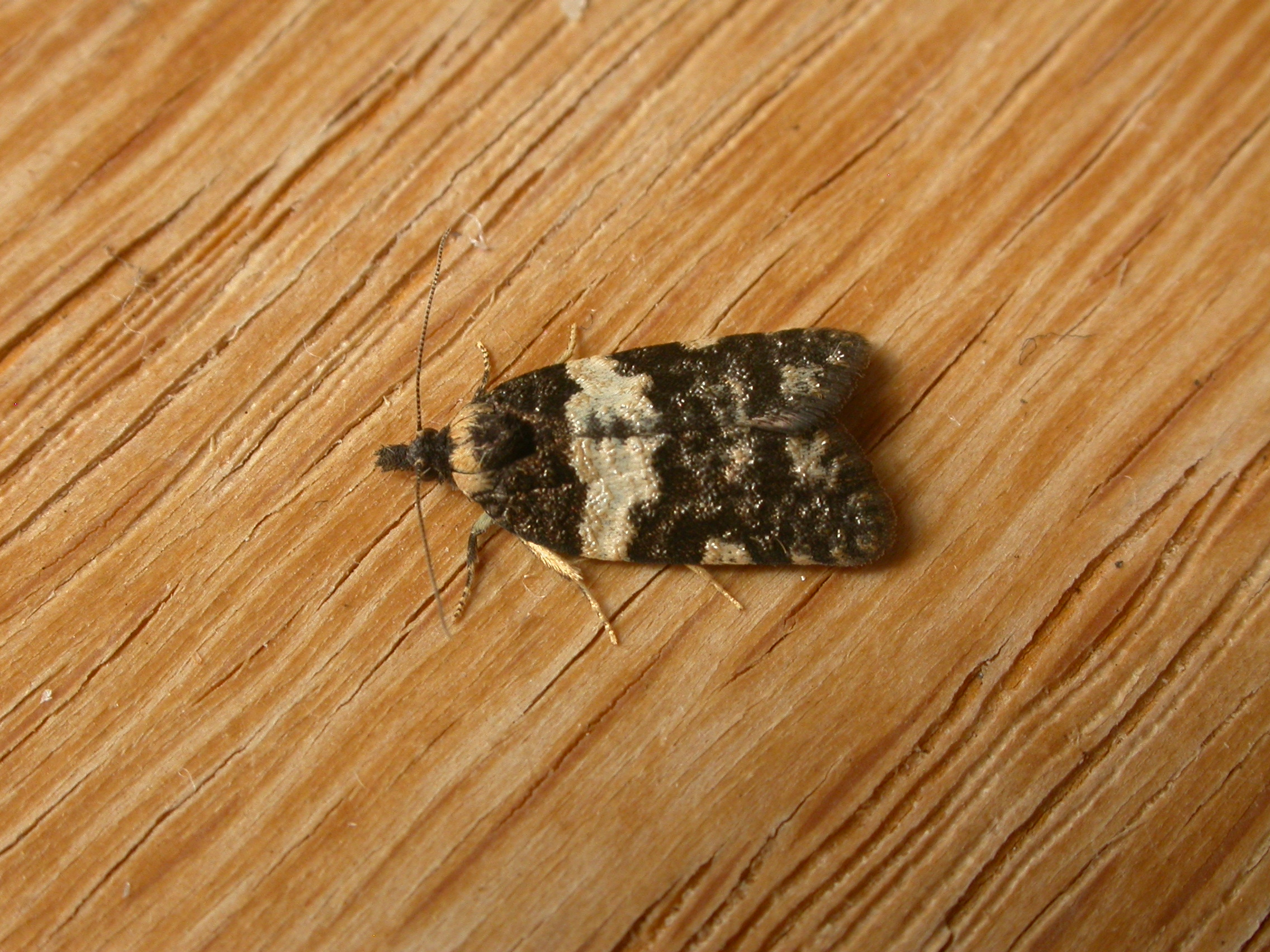

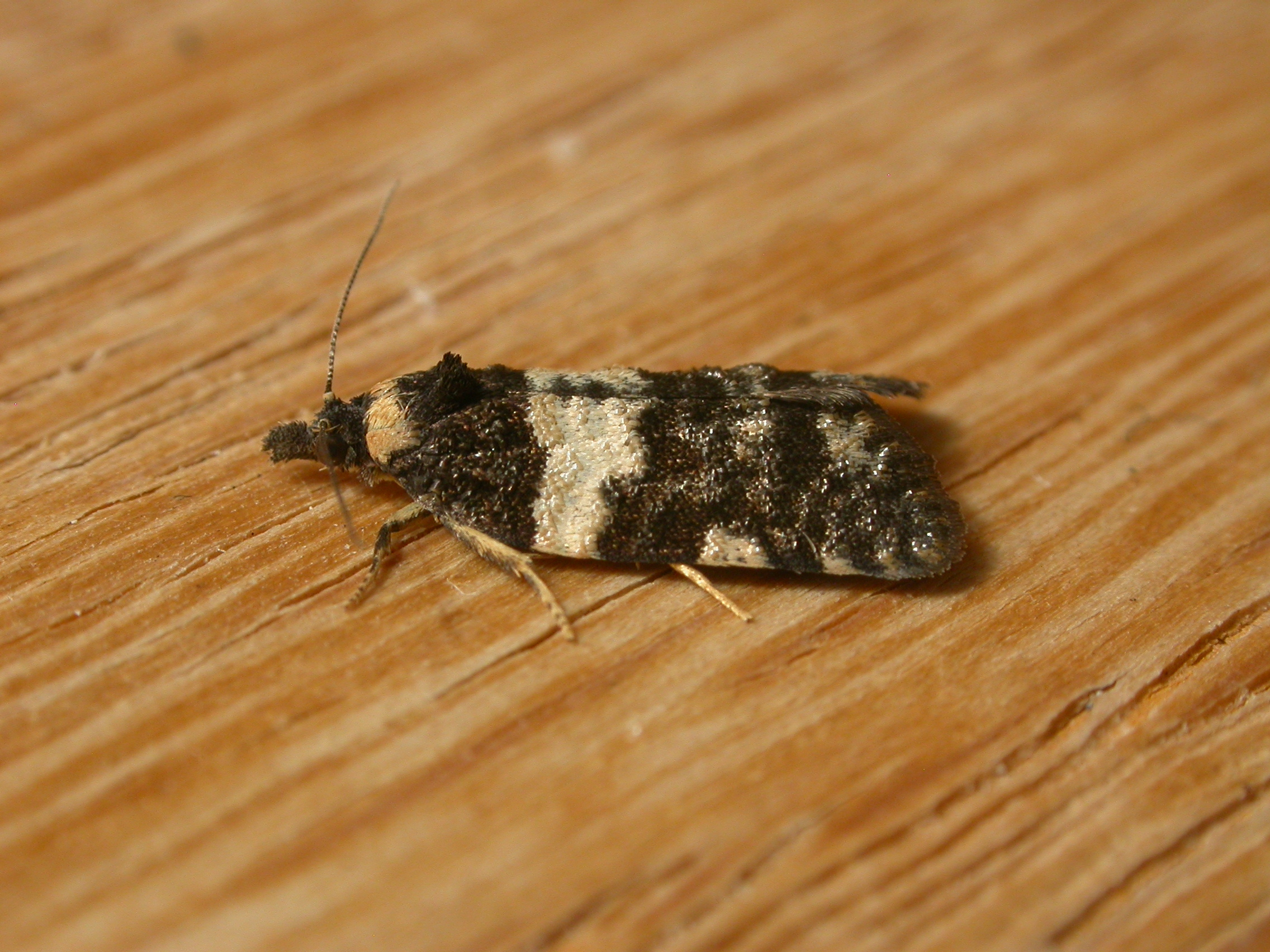

Scientific classification
- Kingdom: Animalia
- Phylum: Arthropoda
- Class: Insecta
- Order: Lepidoptera
- Family: Tortricidae
- Genus: Arotrophora
- Species: A. chionaula

Binomial name
- Arotrophora chionaula Meyrick, 1910

Synonyms
- Dichelia cosmopis Lower, 1894; Capua nummulata Meyrick, 1910; Conchylis tasmaniana Walker, 1863

= Arotrophora chionaula =

Species of moth

Arotrophora chionaula is a moth of the family Tortricidae. It is known from Australia.

== Taxonomy ==
Arotrophora chionaula is the original combination. However, it is known to be misplaced in this genus, but has not been assigned to another genus yet.
