= Peteliacma =

Scientific classification
- Kingdom: Animalia
- Phylum: Arthropoda
- Class: Insecta
- Order: Lepidoptera
- Family: Tortricidae
- Subfamily: Tortricinae
- Genus: Peteliacma; Meyrick, 1912
- Species: P. torrescens

Binomial name
- Peteliacma torrescens Meyrick, 1912

Monotypic genus of tortrix moths

Peteliacma is a genus of moths belonging to the subfamily Tortricinae of the family Tortricidae. It contains only one species, Peteliacma torrescens, which is found in Madagascar.

== See also ==
- List of Tortricidae genera
