= Capua ptilocrossa =

Scientific classification
- Kingdom: Animalia
- Phylum: Arthropoda
- Class: Insecta
- Order: Lepidoptera
- Family: Tortricidae
- Genus: Capua
- Species: C. ptilocrossa

Binomial name
- Capua ptilocrossa Meyrick, 1914

Species of moth of the family Tortricidae

Capua ptilocrossa is a species of moth of the family Tortricidae. It is found in Malawi.

== Taxonomy ==
The species does not belong in the genus Capua and should be placed in a new genus.
