= Capua euryochra =

Scientific classification
- Domain: Eukaryota
- Kingdom: Animalia
- Phylum: Arthropoda
- Class: Insecta
- Order: Lepidoptera
- Family: Tortricidae
- Genus: Capua
- Species: C. euryochra

Binomial name
- Capua euryochra Turner, 1914

Synonyms
- Capua euzona Turner, 1916; Capua dasycerca Turner, 1916; Capua microphaea Turner, 1926

Species of moth

"Capua" euryochra is a species of moth of the family Tortricidae. It is found in Australia, where it has been recorded from Queensland and New South Wales.

The wingspan is 12–13 mm.
