= Viettea =

Scientific classification
- Kingdom: Animalia
- Phylum: Arthropoda
- Class: Insecta
- Order: Lepidoptera
- Family: Tortricidae
- Genus: Viettea
- Species: V. spectabilis

Binomial name
- Viettea spectabilis Diakonoff, 1960

Monotypic genus of tortrix moths

Viettea is a genus of moths belonging to the subfamily Tortricinae of the family Tortricidae. It contains only one species, Viettea spectabilis, which is found on Madagascar.

== See also ==
- List of Tortricidae genera
