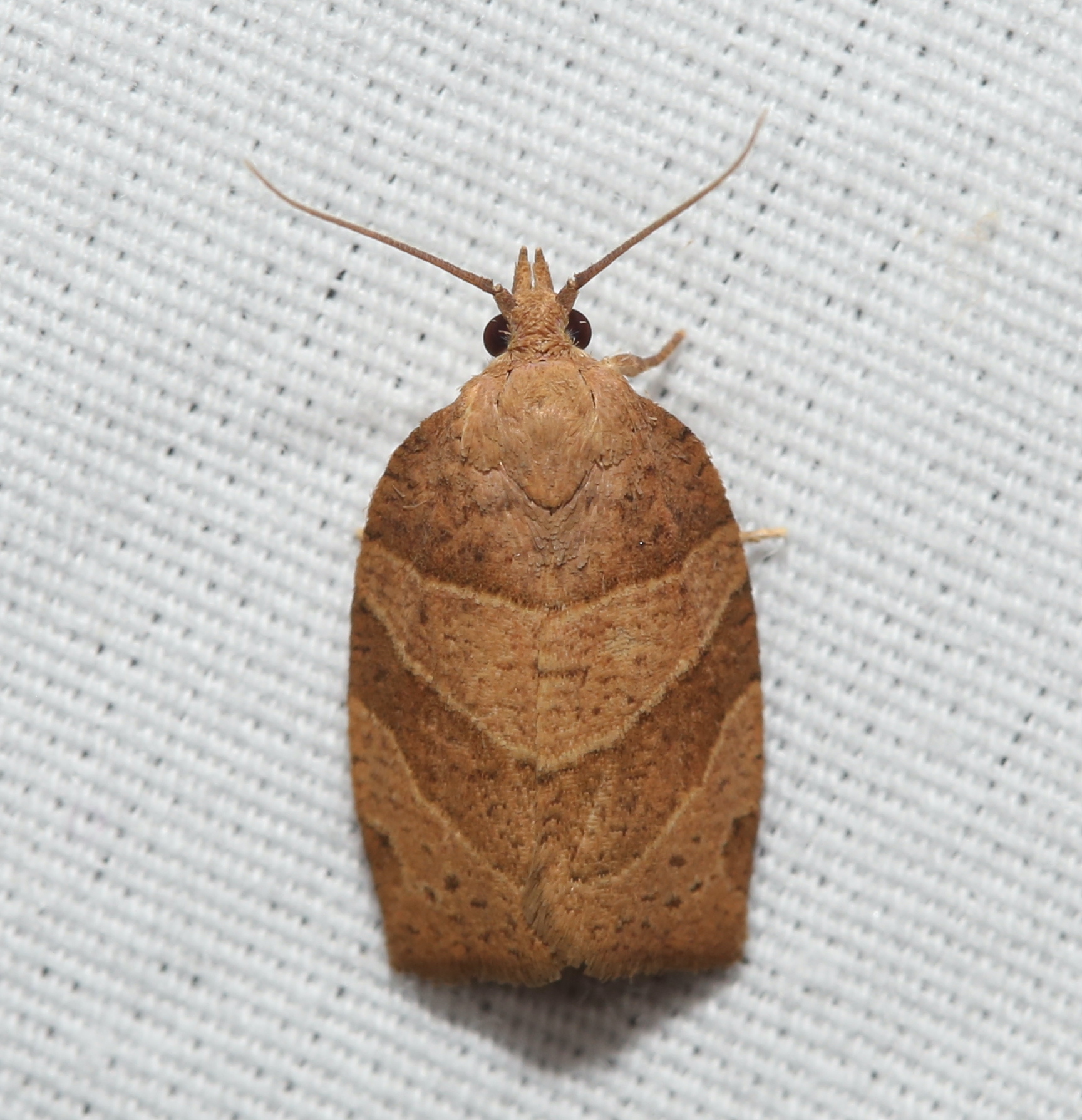

Scientific classification
- Kingdom: Animalia
- Phylum: Arthropoda
- Class: Insecta
- Order: Lepidoptera
- Family: Tortricidae
- Genus: Pandemis
- Species: P. limitata

Binomial name
- Pandemis limitata (Robinson, 1869)

Synonyms
- Tortrix limitata Robinson, 1869; Pandemis limitana Forbes, 1923

= Pandemis limitata =

Species of moth

Pandemis limitata, the three-lined leafroller, is a species of moth of the family Tortricidae. It is found in North America, where it has been recorded from Nova Scotia to British Columbia and from the east coast west to the Rocky Mountains and Arizona. It has also been recorded from Durango in Mexico.

The length of the forewings is 7–9.5 mm for males and 9–12 mm for females.

The larvae are leaf rollers. They feed on Acer negundo, Acer saccharinum, Alnus species (including Alnus incana and Alnus rubra), Betula species (including Betula papyrifera), Corylus species (including Corylus americana), Viburnum species, Euonymus atropurpureus, Cornus racemosa, Vaccinium species, Amorpha fruticosa, Trifolium species, Castanea species, Quercus species (including Quercus alba and Quercus macrocarpa), Myrica gale, Osmunda species, Malus species (including Malus domestica and Malus sylvestris), Prunus species (including Prunus avium and Prunus virginiana), Sorbus species, Populus species (including Populus alba, Populus balsamifera and Populus tremuloides), Salix species, Tilia americana and Ulmus species (including Ulmus americana and Ulmus rubra), and others.

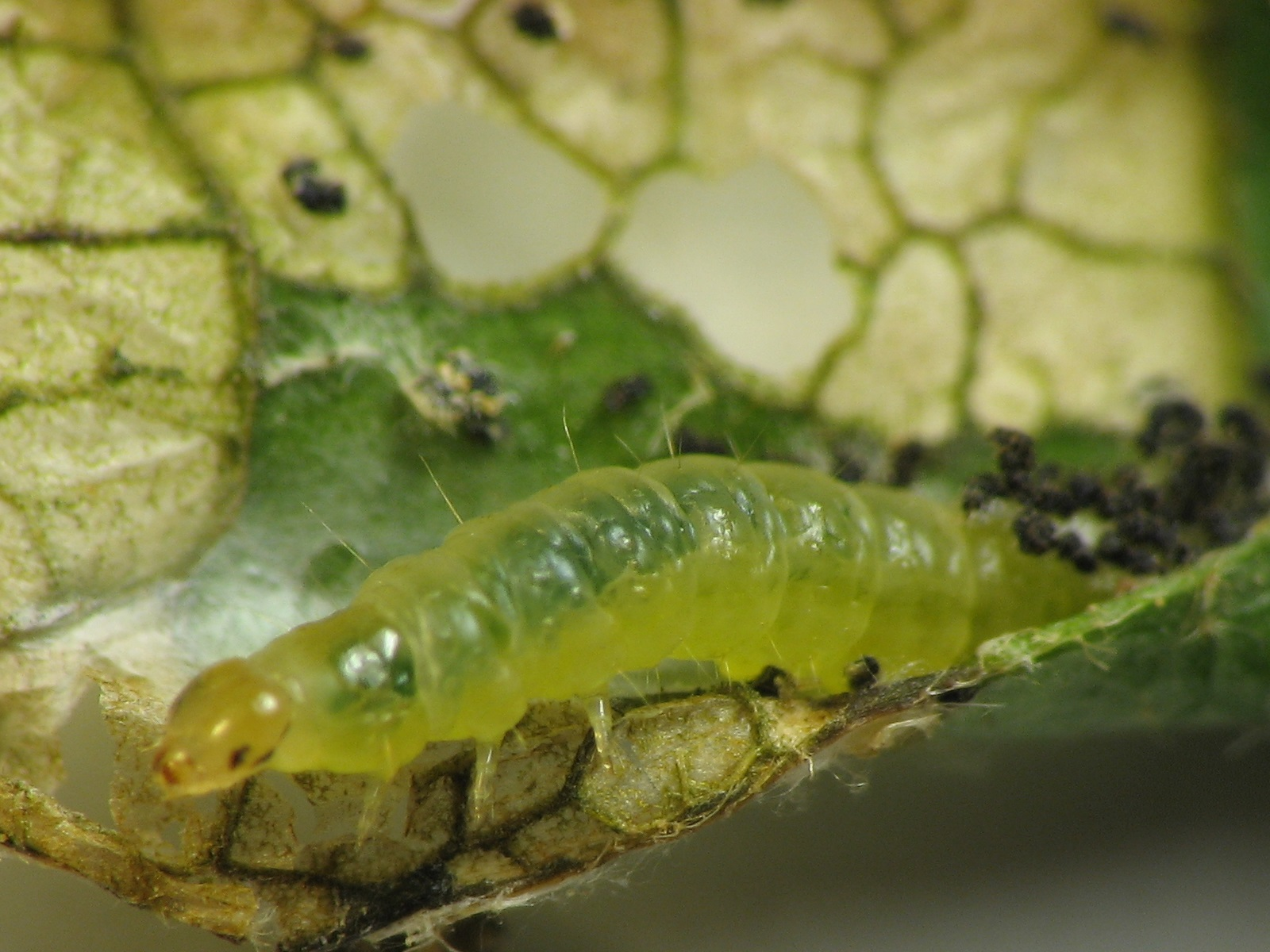
Larva on witch hazel (Hamamelis)

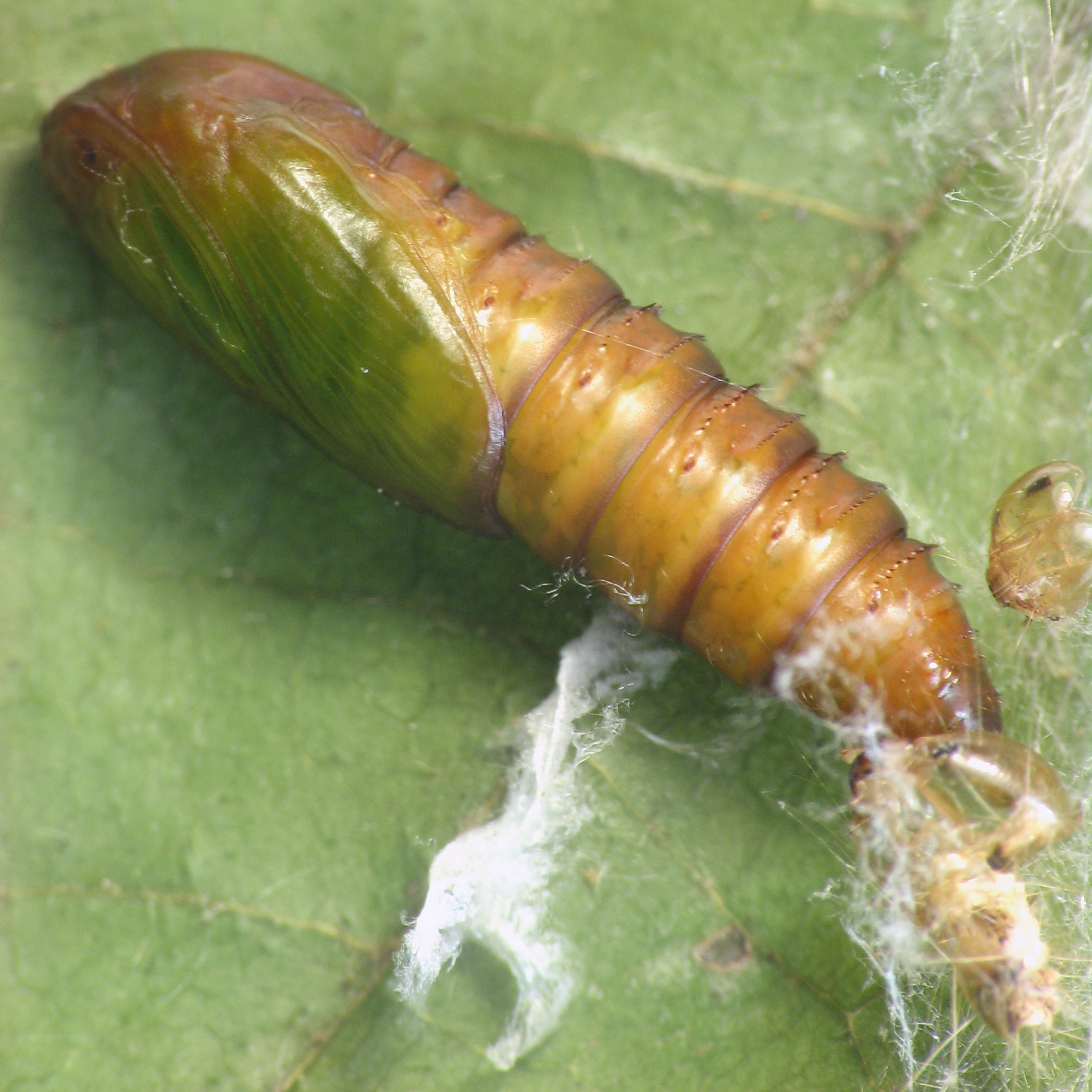
Pupa

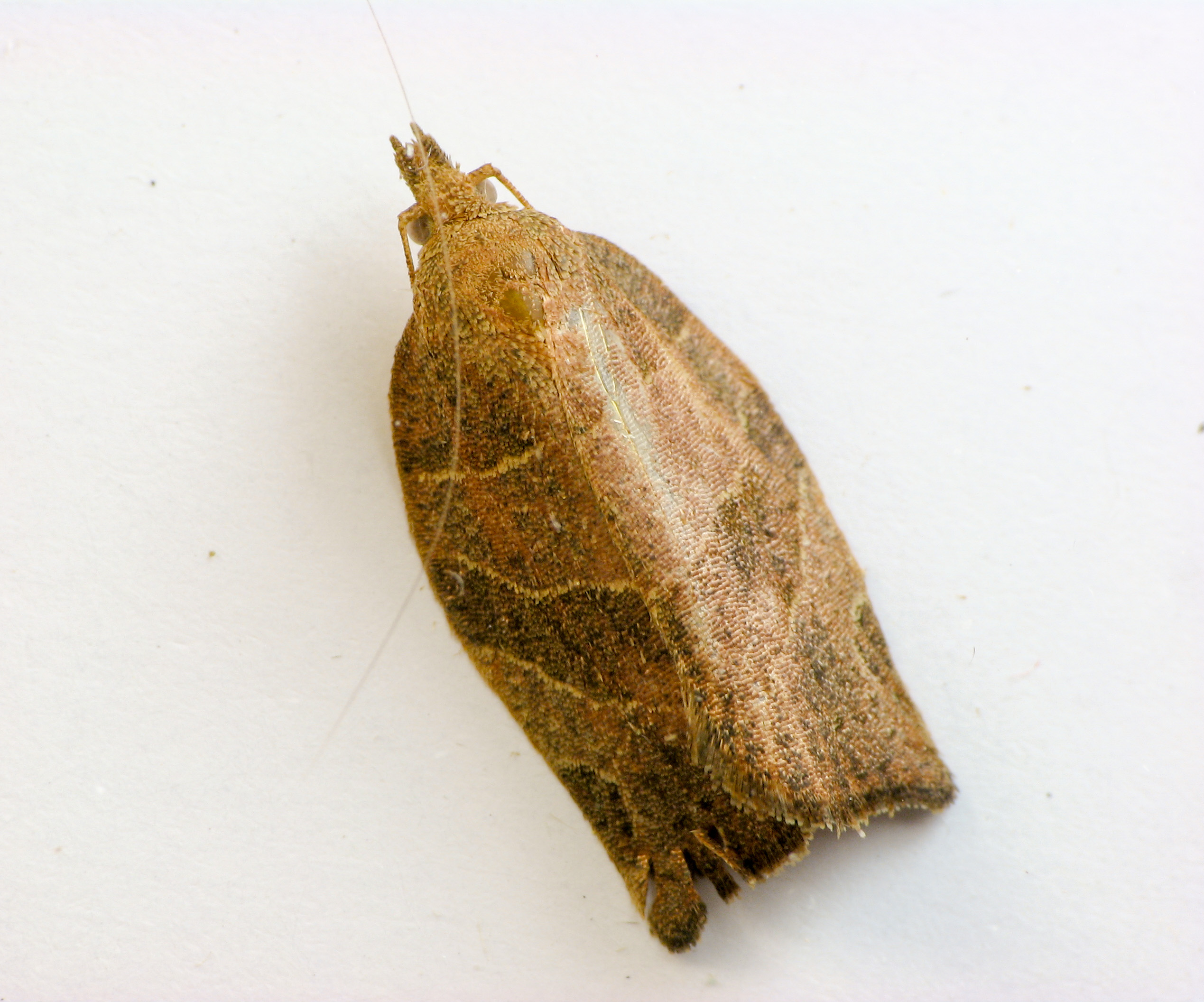
Adult
