= Capua naias =

Scientific classification
- Domain: Eukaryota
- Kingdom: Animalia
- Phylum: Arthropoda
- Class: Insecta
- Order: Lepidoptera
- Family: Tortricidae
- Genus: Capua
- Species: C. naias

Binomial name
- Capua naias Turner, 1916

Synonyms
- Euryochra naias

Species of moth

"Capua" naias is a species of moth of the family Tortricidae. It is found in Australia, where it has been recorded from New South Wales.

The wingspan is about 12 mm. The forewings are white with blackish markings. The hindwings are pale-grey.

== Taxonomy ==
The species does not belong in the genus Capua and should be placed in a new genus.
