= Hiceteria =

Scientific classification
- Domain: Eukaryota
- Kingdom: Animalia
- Phylum: Arthropoda
- Class: Insecta
- Order: Lepidoptera
- Family: Tortricidae
- Subfamily: Tortricinae
- Genus: Hiceteria; Diakonoff, 1953

Genus of tortrix moths

Hiceteria is a genus of moths belonging to the subfamily Tortricinae of the family Tortricidae. The genus was erected by Alexey Diakonoff in 1953.

== Species ==
- Hiceteria heptatoma Diakonoff, 1953
- Hiceteria heterogona Diakonoff, 1953
- Hiceteria stannosa Diakonoff, 1953

== See also ==
- List of Tortricidae genera
