= Capua acrita =

Scientific classification
- Domain: Eukaryota
- Kingdom: Animalia
- Phylum: Arthropoda
- Class: Insecta
- Order: Lepidoptera
- Family: Tortricidae
- Genus: Capua
- Species: C. acrita

Binomial name
- Capua acrita Turner, 1916

Synonyms
- Clarana acrita

Species of moth

Capua acrita is a species of moth of the family Tortricidae. It is found in Australia, where it has been recorded from Victoria.

The wingspan is about 13 mm. The forewings are whitish, mixed with reddish-brown and some scattered fuscous scales. The markings are dark-fuscous, with a few reddish-brown scales. The hindwings are pale-grey, faintly strigulated with whitish.

== Taxonomy ==
The species does not belong in the genus Capua and should be placed in a new genus.
