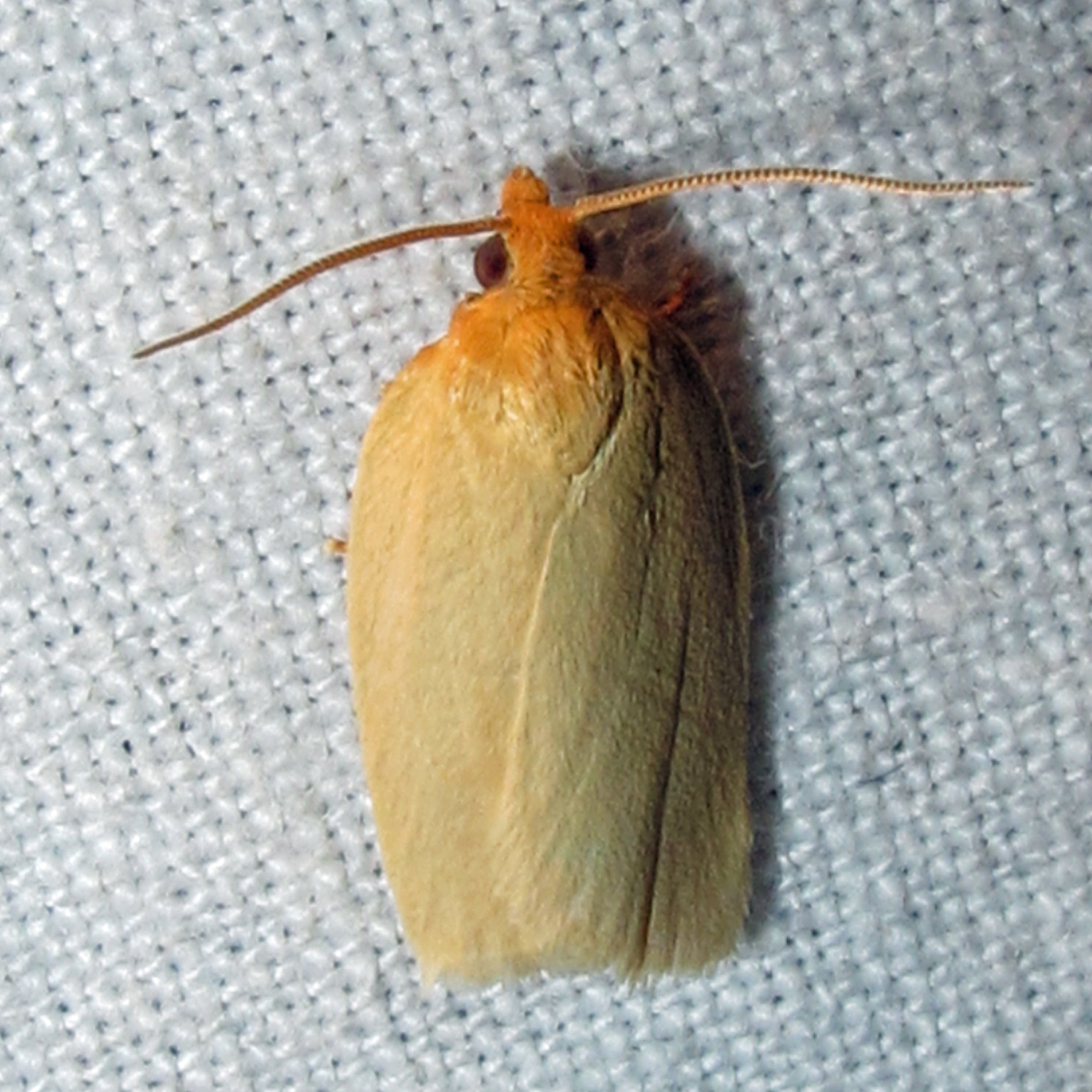

Scientific classification
- Kingdom: Animalia
- Phylum: Arthropoda
- Clade: Pancrustacea
- Class: Insecta
- Order: Lepidoptera
- Family: Tortricidae
- Genus: Xenotemna; Powell, 1964
- Species: X. pallorana

Binomial name
- Xenotemna pallorana (Robinson, 1869)

Synonyms
- Tortrix pallorana Robinson, 1869; Tortrix lata Robinson, 1869

= Xenotemna =

Xenotemna pallorana

Monotypic genus of tortrix moths

Xenotemna is a genus of moths belonging to the family Tortricidae. It contains only one species, Xenotemna pallorana, which is found in North America, where it has been recorded from Alaska to California, east to Florida and north to Quebec and Ontario.

The length of the forewings is 8.5–14 mm.

The larvae feed on Aster, Erigeron annuus, Silphium, Solidago, Symphyotrichum novae-angliae, Hypericum perforatum, Medicago sativa, Melilotus officinalis, Trifolium, Monarda fistulosa, Picea glauca, Pinus banksiana, Pinus resinosa, Pinus strobus, Pinus sylvestris, Fragaria, Malus, Prunus pumila, Prunus serotina, Prunus virginiana, Rosa, Comandra umbellata, Ulmus and Verbena from within folded leaves.
