= Borneogena =

Scientific classification
- Domain: Eukaryota
- Kingdom: Animalia
- Phylum: Arthropoda
- Class: Insecta
- Order: Lepidoptera
- Superfamily: Noctuoidea
- Family: Noctuidae
- Subfamily: Acronictinae
- Genus: Borneogena; Diakonoff, 1941

Genus of tortrix moths

Borneogena is a genus of moths belonging to the subfamily Tortricinae of the family Tortricidae.

== Species ==
- Borneogena antigrapha Diakonoff, 1941
- Borneogena siniaevi Razowski, 2009

== See also ==
- List of Tortricidae genera
