= Tacertaenia =

Scientific classification
- Kingdom: Animalia
- Phylum: Arthropoda
- Class: Insecta
- Order: Lepidoptera
- Family: Tortricidae
- Genus: Tacertaenia; Razowski, 1997
- Species: T. polonorum

Binomial name
- Tacertaenia polonorum Razowski, 1997

Monotypic genus of tortrix moths

Tacertaenia is a genus of moths belonging to the family Tortricidae. It contains only one species, Tacertaenia polonorum, which is found in Brazil (Santa Catarina).

== See also ==
- List of Tortricidae genera
