= Dynatocephala =

Scientific classification
- Domain: Eukaryota
- Kingdom: Animalia
- Phylum: Arthropoda
- Class: Insecta
- Order: Lepidoptera
- Family: Tortricidae
- Subfamily: Tortricinae
- Genus: Dynatocephala; Diakonoff, 1983

Genus of tortrix moths

Dynatocephala is a genus of moths belonging to the family Tortricidae.

== Species ==
- Dynatocephala altivola Razowski, 2009
- Dynatocephala omophaea (Meyrick, 1926)

== See also ==
- List of Tortricidae genera
