= Archips mimicus =

Scientific classification
- Kingdom: Animalia
- Phylum: Arthropoda
- Clade: Pancrustacea
- Class: Insecta
- Order: Lepidoptera
- Family: Tortricidae
- Genus: Archips
- Species: A. mimicus

Binomial name
- Archips mimicus Walsingham, in Swinhoe, 1900

Synonyms
- Cacoecia epicyrta Meyrick, 1905; Archips mimica; Archips epicyrta

Species of moth

Archips mimicus is a species of moth of the family Tortricidae first described by Lord Walsingham in 1900. It is found in India, Sri Lanka and Malaysia. In the Catalogue of Life, the species is considered as a synonym of Archips dispilana.

== Biology ==
It is superficially similar to Archips eupatris.

The larvae feed on Morus, Nephelium lappaceum, Peltophorum, Piper, Prunus, Psidium guajava, Renanthera coccinea, Theobroma cacao, Uncaria gambir, Amherstia nobilis, Bouea macrophylla, Camellia sinensis, Capsicum, Citrus, Coffea liberica, Dalbergia sissoo, Duranta, Glycine max, Indigofera zollingeriana and Lantana species (including Lantana camara).
