= C. solida =

C. solida may refer to:

- Archips solidus, a species of moth, synonymized as Cacoecia solida Meyrick, 1908
- Cellana solida, a species of sea snail
- Clathrodrillia solida, the solid drillia, a species of sea snail
- Clavaria fragilis, fairy fingers, a fungus synonymized as Clavaria solida Gray, 1821
- Coelolepis solida, an extinct species of jawless fish
- Corydalis solida, the fumewort, a flowering plant of northern Eurasia
- Crepidula adunca, a species of sea snail, synonymized as Crepidula solida Hinds, 1845
- Eucithara solida, a species of sea snail, synonymized as Cytharopsis solida (Reeve, 1846)
