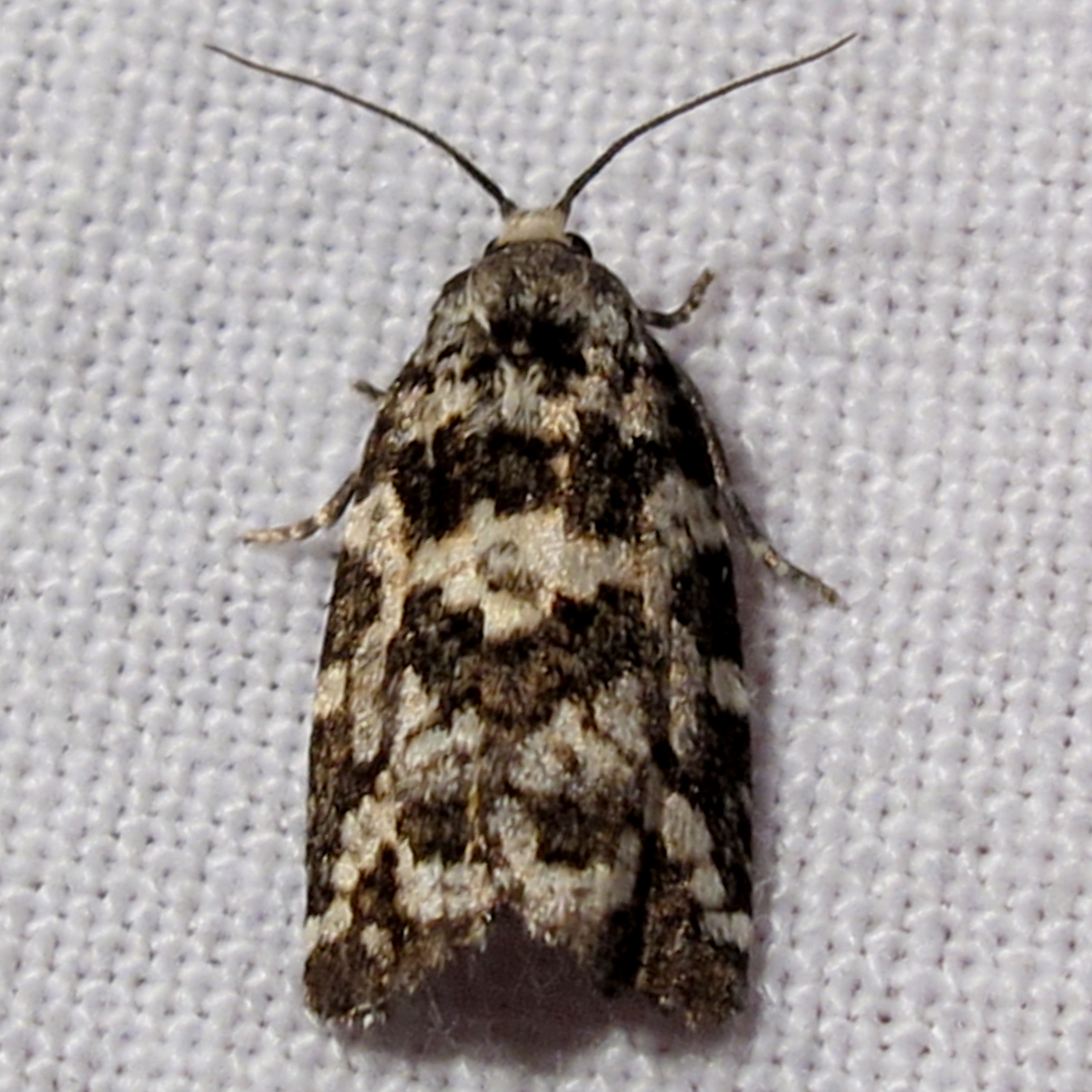

Scientific classification
- Kingdom: Animalia
- Phylum: Arthropoda
- Clade: Pancrustacea
- Class: Insecta
- Order: Lepidoptera
- Family: Tortricidae
- Genus: Archips
- Species: A. packardianus

Binomial name
- Archips packardianus (Fernald, 1886)

Synonyms
- Tortrix packardiana Fernald, 1886; Archips packardiana

= Archips packardianus =

Species of moth

Archips packardianus, the spring spruce needle moth or spruce needleworm, is a species of moth of the family Tortricidae. Spruce needle worms are commonly found in small numbers on spruce and trees of other coniferous genera throughout most of Canada and the northeastern US (Rose and Lindquist 1985).

Archips packardiana overwinters as a tiny larva in a mined needle. Needle mining is resumed in the spring, the larvae later moving to feed on new foliage, where they spin considerable webbing.

Full-grown larvae have a pale green head, sometimes patterned with brown, and a pale body and pale thoracic legs, and are about 20 mm long.

The larva pupates, usually in the webbed needles, and the adult emerges in summer to early fall.

The closely related Archips strianus is much less common, but probably has a habitat similar to that of A. packardiana (Rose and Lindquist 1985). The larvae have dark thoracic legs and small dark areas around the base of the thoracic hairs. The habitat consists of coniferous and mixed woods.

The wingspan is about 17 mm. Adults have been recorded on wing in April and from June to October.

The larvae feed on the needles of Picea and Abies species.
