= Archips dichotoma =

Scientific classification
- Kingdom: Animalia
- Phylum: Arthropoda
- Clade: Pancrustacea
- Class: Insecta
- Order: Lepidoptera
- Family: Tortricidae
- Genus: Archips
- Species: A. dichotoma

Binomial name
- Archips dichotoma Falkovitsh, 1965

Synonyms
- Archips dichotomus

Species of moth

Archips dichotoma is a species of moth of the family Tortricidae. It is found in China (Heilongjiang, Sichuan), North Korea and Russia (Primorye).

The wingspan is about 24 mm.

The larvae feed on Aralia mandshurica, Juglans mandshurica, Prunus mandshurica, Fraxinus rhynochoplylla, Lespedeza bicolor, Maackia amurensis, Ulmus propinqua and Salix rorida.
