= Archips seditiosa =

Scientific classification
- Kingdom: Animalia
- Phylum: Arthropoda
- Clade: Pancrustacea
- Class: Insecta
- Order: Lepidoptera
- Family: Tortricidae
- Genus: Archips
- Species: A. seditiosa

Binomial name
- Archips seditiosa (Meyrick, 1921)

Synonyms
- Cacoecia seditiosa Meyrick, 1921; Cacoecia brachytoma Meyrick, 1932; Cacoecia seditiosa orientalis Diakonoff, 1941

Species of moth

Archips seditiosa is a moth of the family Tortricidae. It is found in western Malaysia and Java.

The larvae have been recorded feeding on Albizia, Derris, Tephrosia purpureae, Hibiscus sabdariffa, Citrus, Solanum tomentosum, Cinnamomum zeylanicum and Glycine max.
