= Archips fumosus =

Scientific classification
- Kingdom: Animalia
- Phylum: Arthropoda
- Clade: Pancrustacea
- Class: Insecta
- Order: Lepidoptera
- Family: Tortricidae
- Genus: Archips
- Species: A. fumosus

Binomial name
- Archips fumosus Kodama, 1960

Synonyms
- Archips fumosus Yasuda, 1961; Archips fumosa

Species of moth

Archips fumosus is a species of moth of the family Tortricidae. It is found in Russia, China (Liaoning, Qinghai, Tibet) and Japan.

The wingspan is about 21 mm for males and 27 mm for females.

The larvae feed on Abies nephrolepis, Picea usperata and Taxus species.
