= Archips myricanus =

Scientific classification
- Kingdom: Animalia
- Phylum: Arthropoda
- Clade: Pancrustacea
- Class: Insecta
- Order: Lepidoptera
- Family: Tortricidae
- Genus: Archips
- Species: A. myricanus

Binomial name
- Archips myricanus (McDunnough, 1923)

Synonyms
- Cacoecia myricana McDunnough, 1923; Archips myricana

Species of moth

Archips myricanus is a species of moth of the family Tortricidae. It is found in North America, where it has been recorded from Maine, Montana and Ontario.

The wingspan is 16–18 mm. Adults are on wing from June to September.

The larvae feed on Chamaedaphne calyculata, Myrica species (including Myrica gale and Myrica pensylvanica), Photinia melanocarpa, Rosa, Salix bebbiana and Spiraea species (including Spiraea alba).
