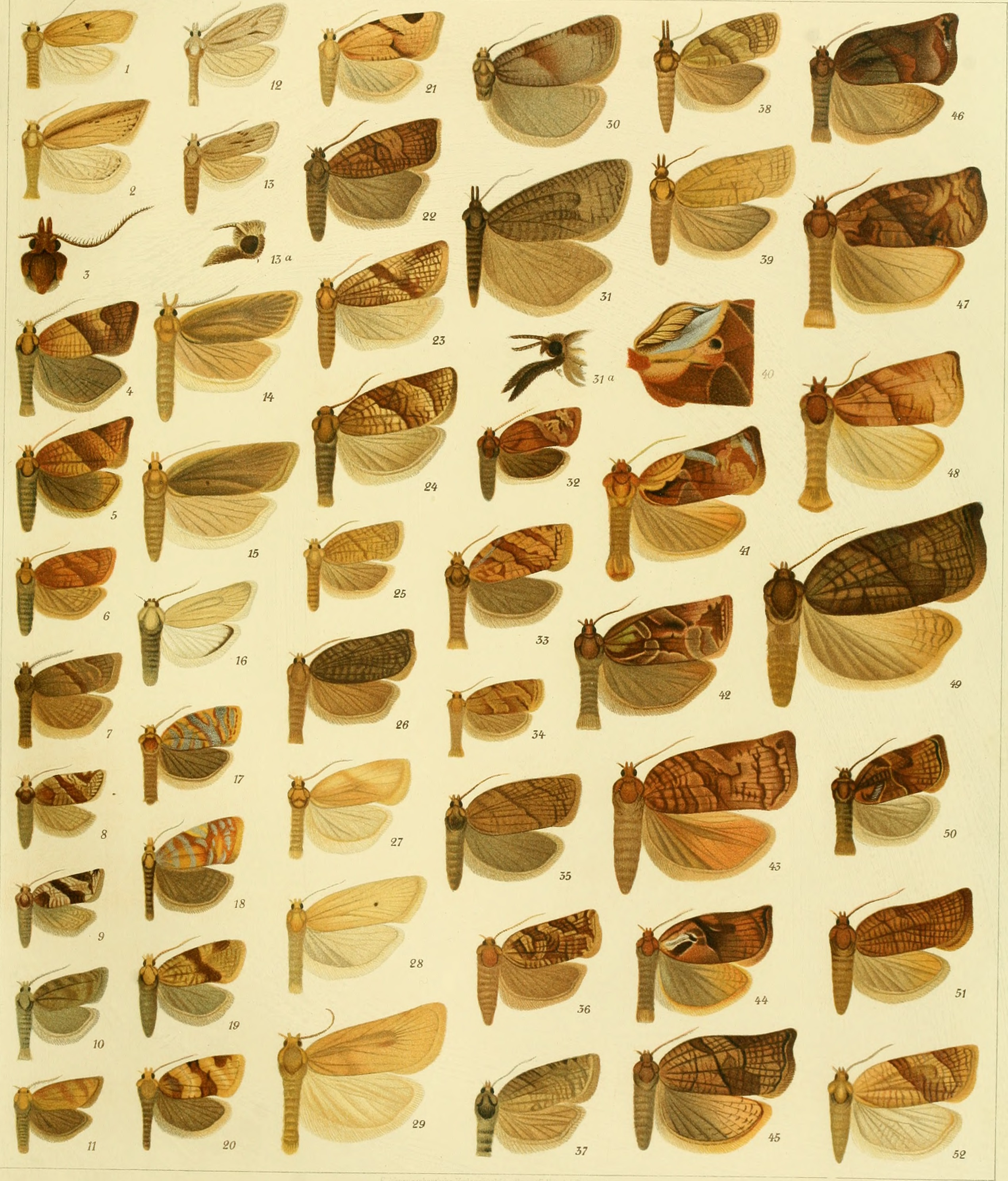
- Archips capsigeranus in Kennel Die palaearktischen tortriciden figures 40, 41

Scientific classification
- Domain: Eukaryota
- Kingdom: Animalia
- Phylum: Arthropoda
- Class: Insecta
- Order: Lepidoptera
- Family: Tortricidae
- Genus: Archips
- Species: A. capsigeranus

Binomial name
- Archips capsigeranus (Kennel, 1901)

Synonyms
- Cacoecia capsigerana Kennel, 1901; Archips capsigerana

= Archips capsigeranus =

Species of moth

Archips capsigeranus is a species of moth of the family Tortricidae. It is found in China (Heilongjiang, Shaanxi, Jiangxi, Sichuan), Korea, Japan and Russia (Pimorye, Ussuri, Askold).

The moth is 20–22 mm for males and 21–26 mm for females. There are two generations per year with adults on wing in June and September in China.

The larvae feed on Abies firma, Abies nephrolepis, Acer, Machilus thunbergii, Pieris polita, Prunus and Persea americana.
