= Archips nigricaudanus =

Scientific classification
- Kingdom: Animalia
- Phylum: Arthropoda
- Clade: Pancrustacea
- Class: Insecta
- Order: Lepidoptera
- Family: Tortricidae
- Genus: Archips
- Species: A. nigricaudanus

Binomial name
- Archips nigricaudanus (Walsingham, 1900)

Synonyms
- Tortrix nigricaudana Walsingham, 1900; Archips nigricaudana

Species of moth

Archips nigricaudanus is a species of moth of the family Tortricidae. It is found in China (Liaoning), Korea, Japan and Russia (Ussuri, Sakhalin, Siberia).

The wingspan is 16–22 mm for males and 22–23 mm for females. Adults are on wing from April to June in China.

The larvae feed on Diospyros, Malus, Morus, Pyrus and Quercus.
