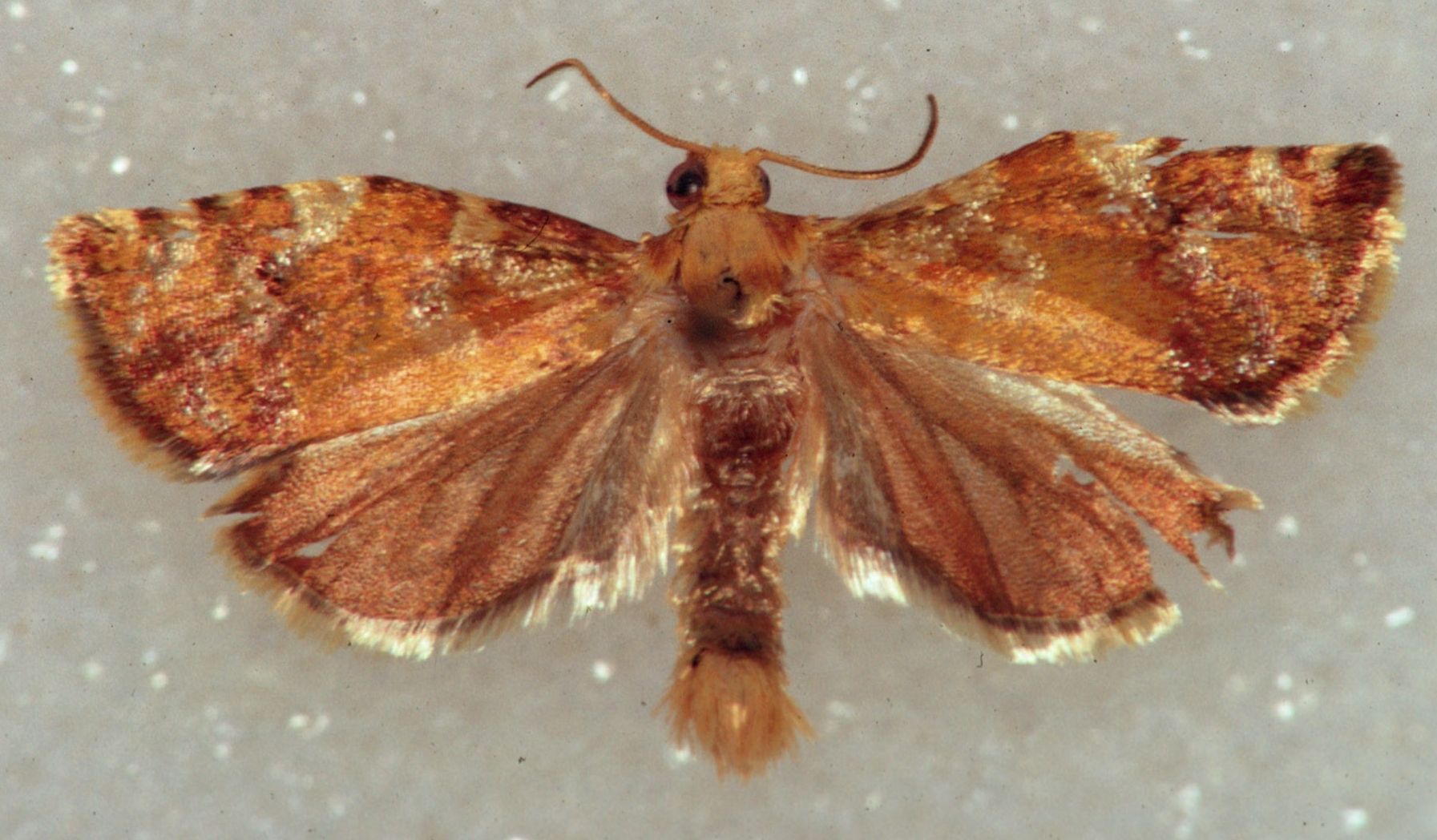
- Archips semiferanus

Scientific classification
- Domain: Eukaryota
- Kingdom: Animalia
- Phylum: Arthropoda
- Class: Insecta
- Order: Lepidoptera
- Family: Tortricidae
- Tribe: Archipini
- Genus: Archips; Hubner, 1822

= Archips =

Genus of tortrix moths

Archips is a genus of tortrix moths the tribe Archipini. Species include the oak leaf roller (A. semiferanus), which eats the leaves of oak trees.

== Species ==
- Archips abiephage (Yasuda, 1975)
- Archips alberta (McDunnough, 1923)
- Archips alcmaeonis (Meyrick, 1928)
- Archips alleni Tuck, 1990
- Archips arcanus Razowski, 1977
- Archips argyrospila (Walker, 1863) – fruit-tree leafroller moth
- Archips asiaticus Walsingham, 1900
- Archips atrolucens (Diakonoff, 1941)
- Archips audax Razowski, 1977
- Archips bachmanus Razowski, 2009
- Archips baolokia Razowski, 2009
- Archips barlowi Tuck, 1990
- Archips betulana (Hubner, [1787])
- Archips biforatus (Meyrick, 1930)
- Archips binigratus (Meyrick, 1928)
- Archips breviplicanus Walsingham, 1900
- Archips brunneatus Razowski, 2009
- Archips bulbosus Razowski, 2009
- Archips cantinus Razowski, 2006
- Archips capsigeranus (Kennel, 1901)
- Archips carteri Rose & Pooni, 2004
- Archips cerasivoranus (Fitch, 1856) – ugly-nest caterpillar
- Archips ceylonicus Razowski, 1977
- Archips citimus Razowski, 1977
- Archips compitalis Razowski, 1977
- Archips crassifolianus Liu, 1990
- Archips crataeganus (Hubner, [1796-1799]) – brown oak tortrix

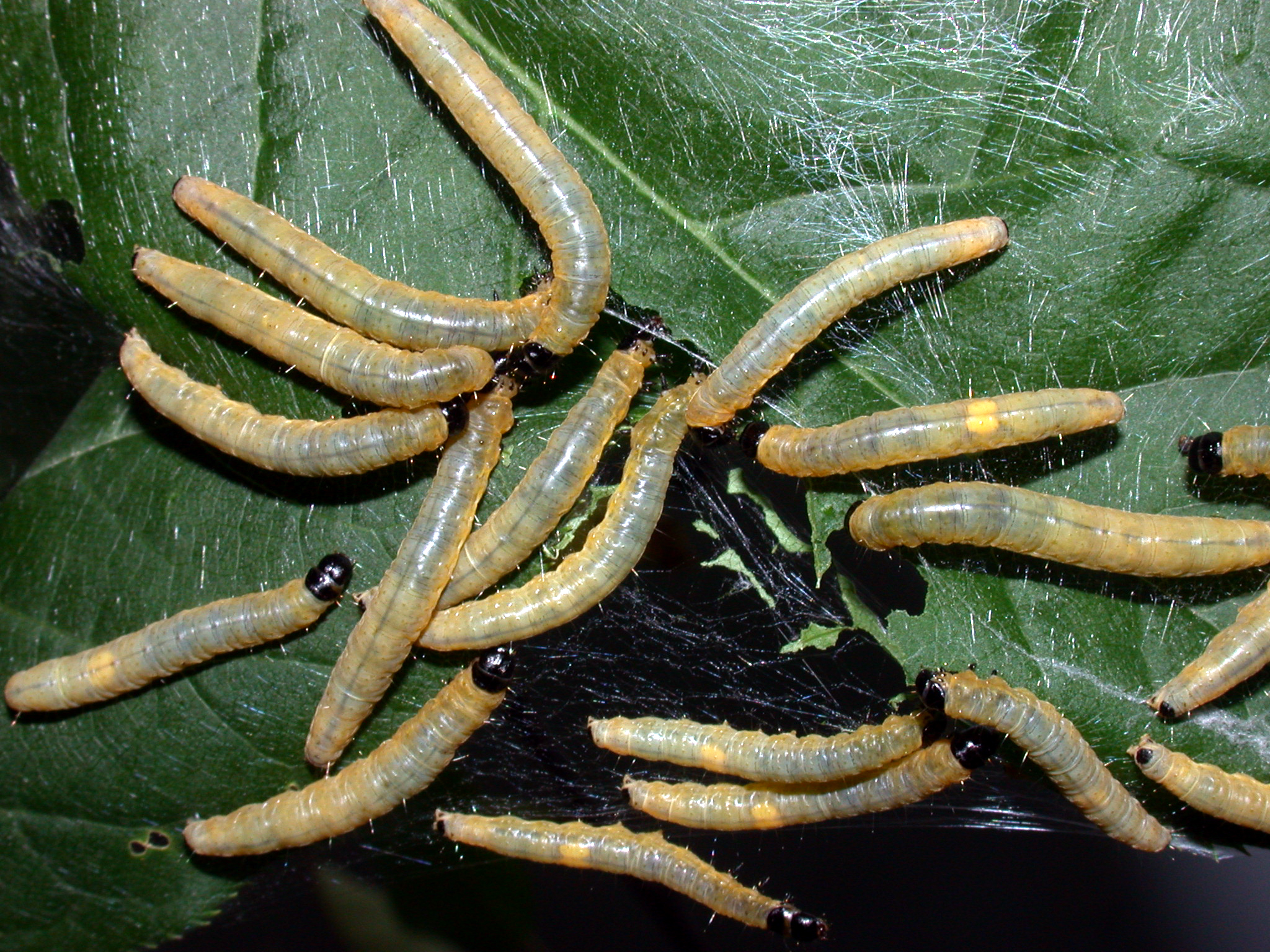
Archips cerasivorana

- Archips davisi Kawabe, 1989
- Archips dichotoma Falkovitsh, 1965
- Archips dierli Diakonoff, 1976
- Archips dispilanus (Walker, 1864)
- Archips dissitanus (Grote, 1879)
- Archips eleagnanus (McDunnough, 1923)
- Archips elongatus Liu, 1987
- Archips emitescens (Meyrick, in de Joannis, 1930)
- Archips enodis Razowski, 1977
- Archips eupatris (Meyrick, 1908)
- Archips euryplinthus (Meyrick, 1923)
- Archips eximius Razowski, 1984
- Archips expansus (Diakonoff, 1941)
- Archips fervidanus (Clemens, 1860) – oak webworm
- Archips formosanus (Kawabe, 1968)
- Archips fraternus Tuck, 1990
- Archips fumosus Kodama, 1960
- Archips fuscocupreanus (Walsingham, 1900)
- Archips georgianus (Walker, 1863)
- Archips goyeranus Kruse, 2000 – baldcypress leafroller

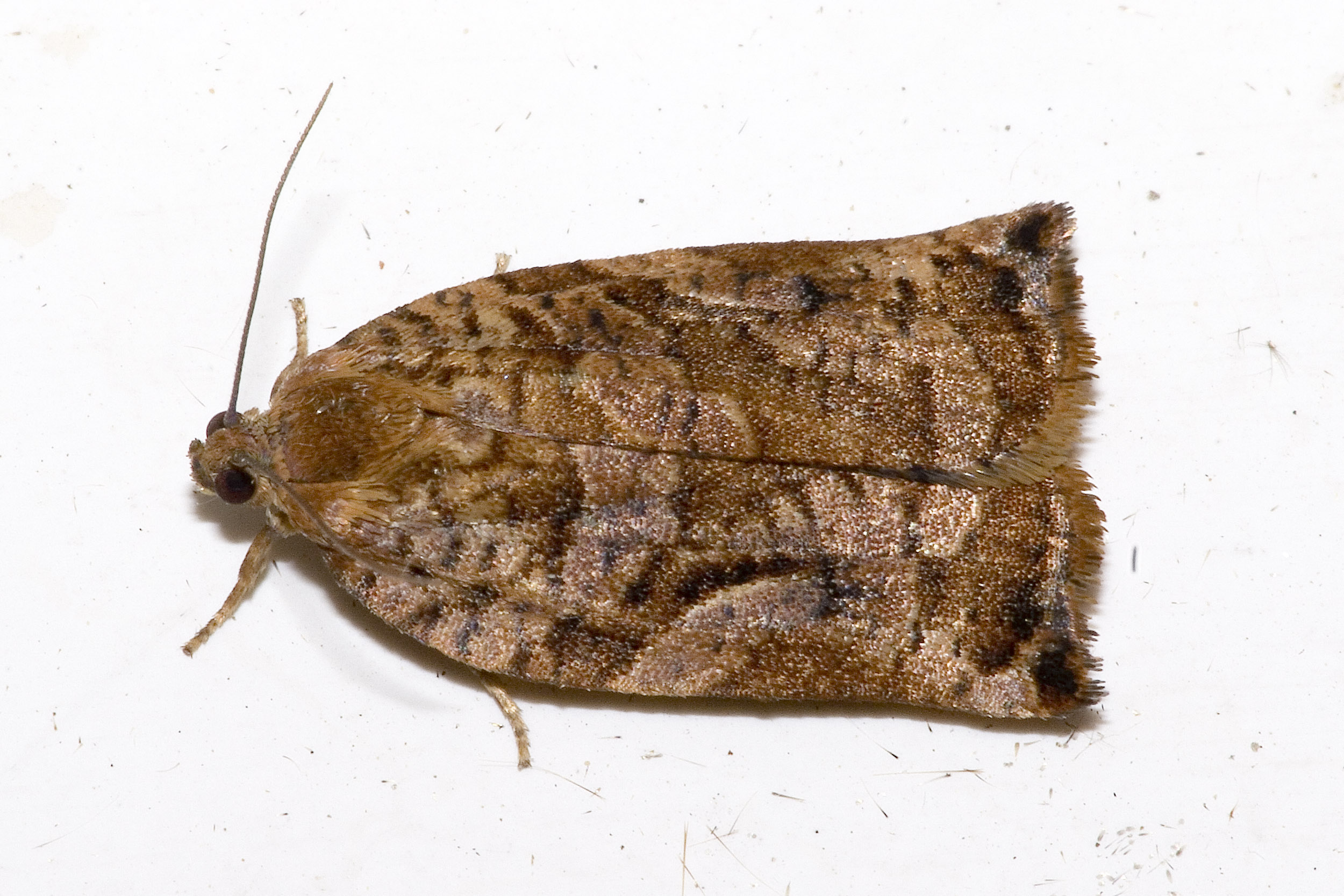
Archips oporanus

- Archips griseus (Robinson, 1869) – black shield leafroller, gray archips moth
- Archips gyraleus Diakonoff, 1982
- Archips inanis Razowski, 1977
- Archips infumatanus (Zeller, 1875)
- Archips ingentanus (Christoph, 1881)
- Archips inopinatanus (Kennel, 1901)
- Archips insulanus (Kawabe, 1965)
- Archips issikii Kodama, 1960
- Archips kangraensis Rose & Pooni, 2004
- Archips kellerianus Liu, 1987
- Archips limatus Razowski, 1977
- Archips machlopis (Meyrick, 1912)
- Archips magnificus Tuck, 1990
- Archips magnolianus (Fernald, 1892)
- Archips menotoma (Meyrick, 1937)
- Archips meridionalis Yasuda & Kawabe, 1980
- Archips mertias Rose & Pooni, 2004
- Archips micaceanus (Walker, 1863)
- Archips mimicus Walsingham, in Swinhoe, 1900
- Archips mortuanus (Kearfott, 1907)
- Archips myricanus (McDunnough, 1923)
- Archips myrrhophanes (Meyrick, in Caradja, 1931)
- Archips naltaricus Razowski, 2006
- Archips negundanus (Dyar, 1902) – larger boxelder leafroller
- Archips nigricaudanus (Walsingham, 1900)
- Archips nigriplaganus Franclemont, 1986
- Archips okuiho Razowski, 2009
- Archips opiparus Liu, 1987
- Archips oporana (Linnaeus, 1758)
- Archips pachyvalvus Liu, 1987
- Archips packardianus (Fernald, 1886)
- Archips paredraeus (Meyrick, 1931)

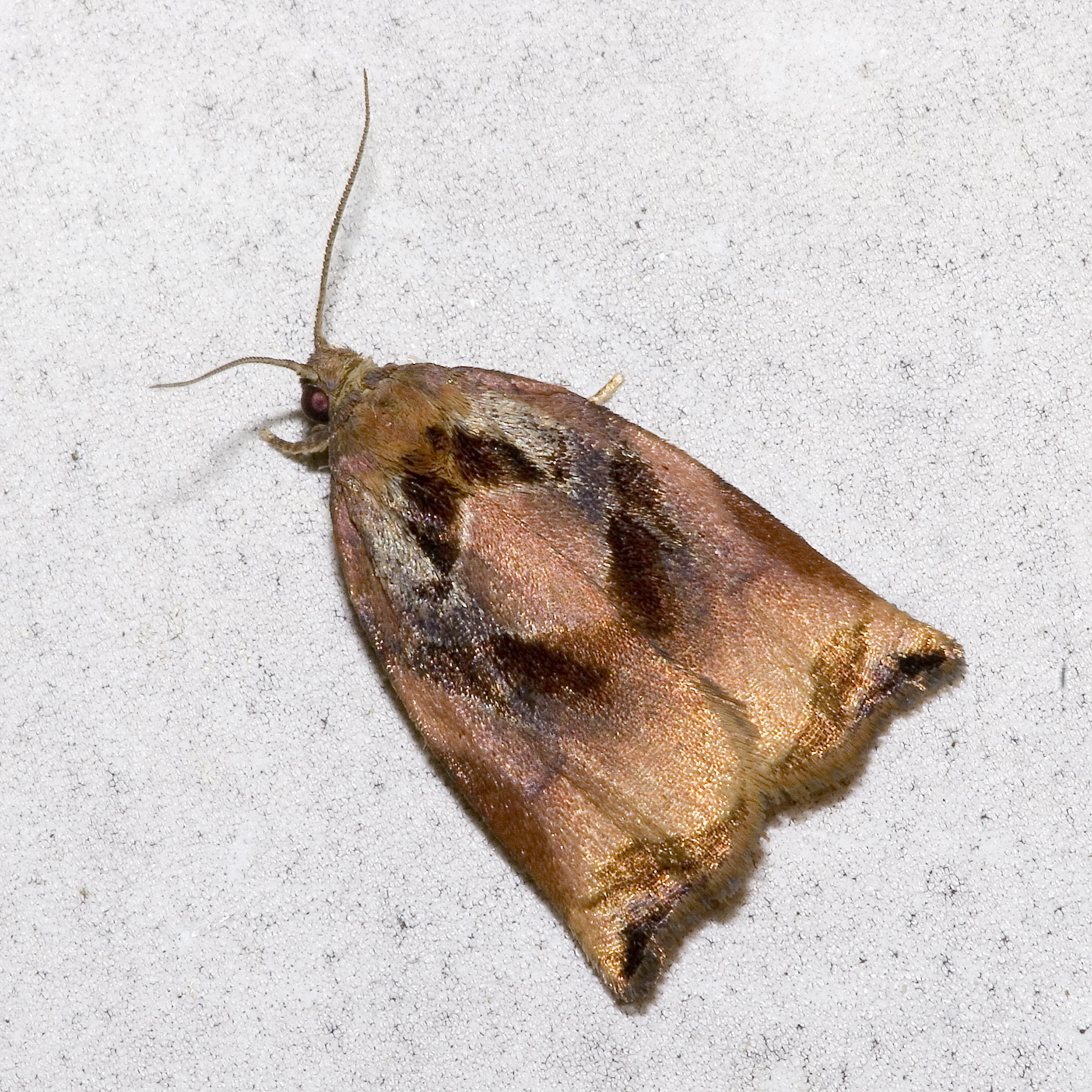
Archips podana

- Archips pensilis (Meyrick, 1920)
- Archips peratratus Yasuda, 1961
- Archips philippa (Meyrick, 1918)
- Archips podana (Scopoli, 1763) – large fruit tree tortrix
- Archips pseudotermias Rose & Pooni, 2004
- Archips pulchra (Butler, 1879)
- Archips punctiseriatus (Strand, 1920)
- Archips purpuranus (Clemens, 1865)
- Archips rileyanus (Grote, 1868)
- Archips rosana (Linnaeus, 1758) – rose tortrix
- Archips rudy Razowski, 1977
- Archips seditiosus (Meyrick, 1921)
- Archips semiferanus (Walker, 1863) – oak leafroller
- Archips semistructus (Meyrick, 1937)
- Archips shibatai Kawabe, 1985
- Archips silvicolanus Razowski, 2009
- Archips socotranus Walsingham, 1900
- Archips solidus (Meyrick, 1908)

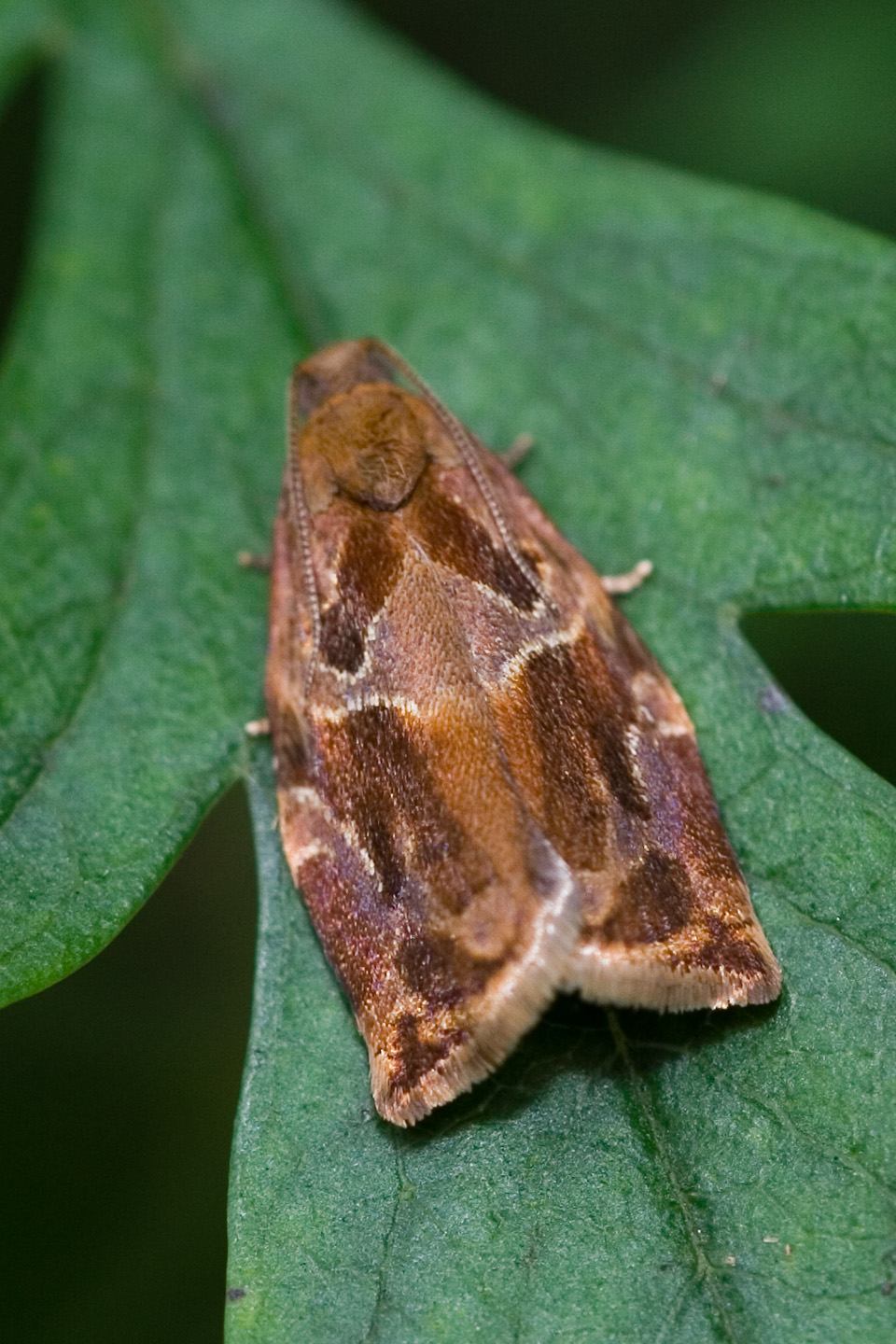
Archips xylosteanus

- Archips spinatus Liu, 1987
- Archips stellatus Jinbo, 2006
- Archips strianus Fernald, 1905
- Archips strigopterus Liu, 1987
- Archips strojny Razowski, 1977
- Archips subgyraleus Razowski, 2009
- Archips subrufanus (Snellen, 1883)
- Archips subsidiarius (Meyrick, 1924)
- Archips symmetrus (Meyrick, 1918)
- Archips taichunganus Razowski, 2000
- Archips taiwanensis Kawabe, 1985
- Archips termias (Meyrick, 1918) – apple leafroller
- Archips tharsaleopus (Meyrick, in Caradja & Meyrick, 1935)
- Archips tsuganus (Powell, 1962)
- Archips unimaculatus Shiraki, 1913
- Archips vagrans Tuck, 1990
- Archips viola Falkovitsh, 1965
- Archips vivesi Razowski, 2009
- Archips wallacei Tuck, 1990
- Archips xylosteanus (Linnaeus, 1758) – variegated golden tortrix, brown oak tortrix

== Selected former species ==
- Archips occidentalis (Walsingham, 1891)

== Synonyms ==
- Archiceps Weiss & Dickerson, 1921
- Archippus H.A. Freeman, 1958
- Archyps Liu, 1987
- Cacoecia Hübner, [1825] 1816
- Cacoesia Llewellyn-Jones, 1939
- Parachips Kuznetzov, 1970 [subgenus of Archips]
