= Archips punctiseriatus =

Scientific classification
- Kingdom: Animalia
- Phylum: Arthropoda
- Clade: Pancrustacea
- Class: Insecta
- Order: Lepidoptera
- Family: Tortricidae
- Genus: Archips
- Species: A. punctiseriatus

Binomial name
- Archips punctiseriatus (Strand, 1920)

Synonyms
- Catamacta punctiseriata Strand, 1920; Archips punctiseriata

Species of moth

Archips punctiseriatus is a species of moth of the family Tortricidae. It is found in Taiwan.
