= Archips pulchra =

Scientific classification
- Kingdom: Animalia
- Phylum: Arthropoda
- Clade: Pancrustacea
- Class: Insecta
- Order: Lepidoptera
- Family: Tortricidae
- Genus: Archips
- Species: A. pulchra

Binomial name
- Archips pulchra (Butler, 1879)

Synonyms
- Ariola pulchra Butler, 1879; Ariola puchra anonymous, 1970; Archips pulcher Razowski, 1977

Species of moth

Archips pulchra is a species of moth of the family Tortricidae. It is found in China (Heilongjiang), South Korea, Japan and Russia (Primorye).

The wingspan is 19.5–25 mm. There is one generation per year with adults on wing in July.

The larvae feed on Abies nephrolepis and Picea asperata. The species overwinters as a young larva. Pupation takes place in mid-June.
