= Archips magnolianus =

Scientific classification
- Kingdom: Animalia
- Phylum: Arthropoda
- Clade: Pancrustacea
- Class: Insecta
- Order: Lepidoptera
- Family: Tortricidae
- Genus: Archips
- Species: A. magnolianus

Binomial name
- Archips magnolianus (Fernald, 1892)

Synonyms
- Cacoecia magnoliana Fernald, 1892; Archips magnoliana

Species of moth

Archips magnolianus is a species of moth of the family Tortricidae. It is found in the United States, where it has been recorded from Alabama, Georgia, Kentucky, Louisiana, Maryland, Mississippi, New York, North Carolina, Ohio, Pennsylvania, South Carolina, Tennessee and West Virginia.

The wingspan is 20–21 mm. Adults are on wing from May to September.

The larvae feed on Magnolia species, including Magnolia acuminata.
