= Archips semistructus =

Scientific classification
- Kingdom: Animalia
- Phylum: Arthropoda
- Clade: Pancrustacea
- Class: Insecta
- Order: Lepidoptera
- Family: Tortricidae
- Genus: Archips
- Species: A. semistructus

Binomial name
- Archips semistructus (Meyrick, 1937)

Synonyms
- Cacoecia semistructa Meyrick, 1937; Archips semistructa; Archips brevicervicus Kodama, 1960; Archips brevicervicus Yasuda, 1961; Archippus semistractus Kawabe, 1965

Species of moth

Archips semistructus is a species of moth of the family Tortricidae. It is found in China and Japan.

The wingspan is 16–20 mm for males and 17–25 mm for females.

The larvae feed on Artemisia (including Artemisia princeps), Cryptomeria japonica, Elaeagnus, Fragaria chiloensis, Prunus mume, Prunus serotina, Punica granatum and Rubus species (including Rubus microphyllus).
