= Archips unimaculatus =

Scientific classification
- Kingdom: Animalia
- Phylum: Arthropoda
- Clade: Pancrustacea
- Class: Insecta
- Order: Lepidoptera
- Family: Tortricidae
- Genus: Archips
- Species: A. unimaculatus

Binomial name
- Archips unimaculatus Shiraki, 1913

Species of moth

Archips unimaculatus is a species of moth of the family Tortricidae. It is found in Taiwan.
