= Archips kellerianus =

Scientific classification
- Kingdom: Animalia
- Phylum: Arthropoda
- Clade: Pancrustacea
- Class: Insecta
- Order: Lepidoptera
- Family: Tortricidae
- Genus: Archips
- Species: A. kellerianus

Binomial name
- Archips kellerianus Liu, 1987

Synonyms
- Archips kelleriana

Species of moth

Archips kellerianus is a species of moth of the family Tortricidae. It is found in Yunnan and Sichuan, China.

The length of the forewings is 8–10 mm for males and 10–12 mm for females.
