= Archips taichunganus =

Scientific classification
- Kingdom: Animalia
- Phylum: Arthropoda
- Clade: Pancrustacea
- Class: Insecta
- Order: Lepidoptera
- Family: Tortricidae
- Genus: Archips
- Species: A. taichunganus

Binomial name
- Archips taichunganus Razowski, 2000

Species of moth

Archips taichunganus is a moth of the family Tortricidae. It is found in Taiwan.

The wingspan is 29 mm.
