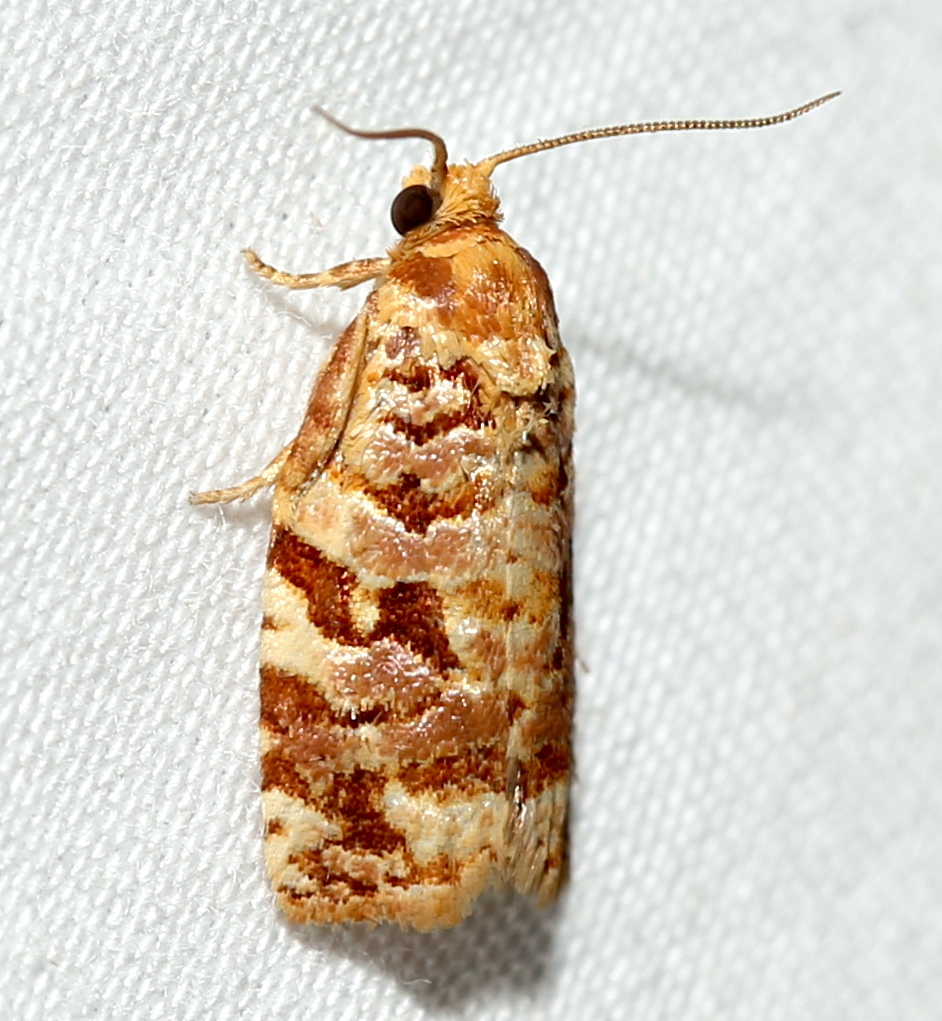

Scientific classification
- Kingdom: Animalia
- Phylum: Arthropoda
- Class: Insecta
- Order: Lepidoptera
- Family: Tortricidae
- Genus: Archips
- Species: A. georgianus

Binomial name
- Archips georgianus (Walker, 1863)

Synonyms
- Retinia georgiana Walker, 1863; Archips georgiana; Cacoecia georgiana

= Archips georgianus =

Species of moth

Archips georgianus, the Georgia archips moth, is a species of moth of the family Tortricidae. It is found in North America, where it has been recorded from New Jersey, south to Florida and then west to Texas.

The wingspan is 15–22 mm. The forewings are bright reddish chestnut with shining pinkish ochreous bands and mottlings. The hindwings are brown. Adults have been recorded on wing from May to August.

The larvae feed on Vaccinium, Carya and Quercus species (including Quercus laevis).
