= Archips formosanus =

Scientific classification
- Kingdom: Animalia
- Phylum: Arthropoda
- Clade: Pancrustacea
- Class: Insecta
- Order: Lepidoptera
- Family: Tortricidae
- Genus: Archips
- Species: A. formosanus

Binomial name
- Archips formosanus (Kawabe, 1968)

Synonyms
- Archippus formosanus Kawabe, 1968; Archips formosana

Species of moth

Archips formosanus is a species of moth of the family Tortricidae. It is found in Taiwan.
