= Archips baolokia =

Scientific classification
- Kingdom: Animalia
- Phylum: Arthropoda
- Clade: Pancrustacea
- Class: Insecta
- Order: Lepidoptera
- Family: Tortricidae
- Genus: Archips
- Species: A. baolokia

Binomial name
- Archips baolokia Razowski, 2009

Species of moth

Archips baolokia is a moth of the family Tortricidae. It is found in Vietnam.

The wingspan is 17 mm (0.67 in).

== Etymology ==
This name refers to the type locality in Vietnam, Bao Lok.
