= Archips philippa =

Scientific classification
- Kingdom: Animalia
- Phylum: Arthropoda
- Clade: Pancrustacea
- Class: Insecta
- Order: Lepidoptera
- Family: Tortricidae
- Genus: Archips
- Species: A. philippa

Binomial name
- Archips philippa (Meyrick, 1918)

Synonyms
- Cacoecia philippa Meyrick, 1918; Cacoecia pruneticola Meyrick, 1935

Species of moth

Archips philippa is a species of moth of the family Tortricidae. It is found in Iran, Afghanistan, Pakistan and Kashmir.

The wingspan is 19.5–22 mm for males and 22.5 mm for females.

The larvae feed on Pyrus communis, Abelmoschus esculentus, Hedera, Malus, Prunus and Vitis species.
