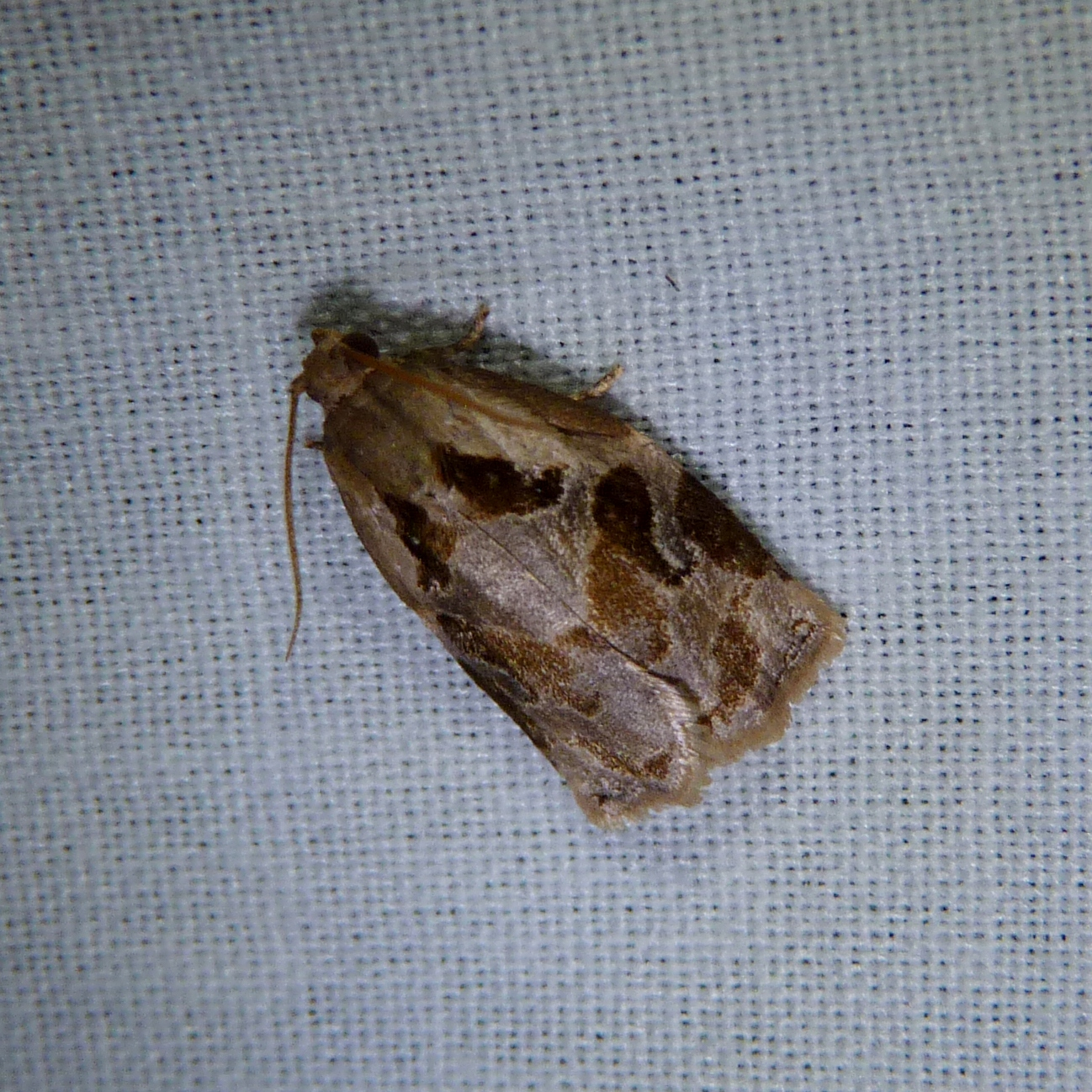

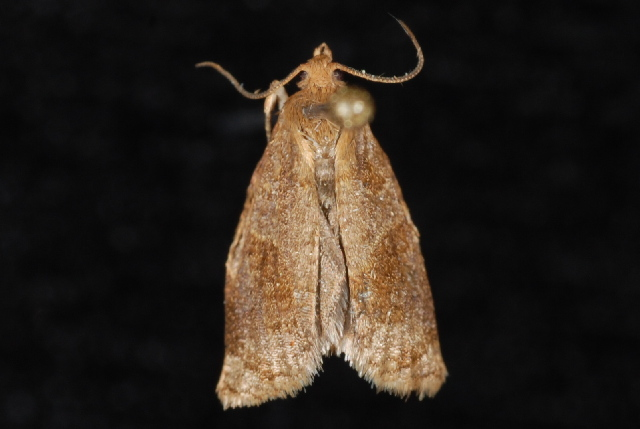

Scientific classification
- Kingdom: Animalia
- Phylum: Arthropoda
- Clade: Pancrustacea
- Class: Insecta
- Order: Lepidoptera
- Family: Tortricidae
- Genus: Archips
- Species: A. grisea

Binomial name
- Archips grisea (Robinson, 1869)

Synonyms
- Tortrix grisea Robinson, 1869; Cacoecia brauniana Kearfott, 1907

= Archips grisea =

Species of moth

Archips grisea, the gray archips moth or black shield leafroller, is a species of moth of the family Tortricidae. It is found in North America (including Alabama, Illinois, Minnesota, Oklahoma, Ontario, Tennessee and Texas).

The wingspan is 18–22 mm.

The larvae feed on Carya species.
