= Archips symmetrus =

Scientific classification
- Kingdom: Animalia
- Phylum: Arthropoda
- Clade: Pancrustacea
- Class: Insecta
- Order: Lepidoptera
- Family: Tortricidae
- Genus: Archips
- Species: A. symmetrus

Binomial name
- Archips symmetrus (Meyrick, 1918)

Synonyms
- Cacoecia symmetra Meyrick, 1918; Archips symmetra

Species of moth

Archips symmetrus is a species of moth of the family Tortricidae. It is found in the Republic of the Congo and the Democratic Republic of the Congo.
