= Archips inopinatanus =

Scientific classification
- Kingdom: Animalia
- Phylum: Arthropoda
- Clade: Pancrustacea
- Class: Insecta
- Order: Lepidoptera
- Family: Tortricidae
- Genus: Archips
- Species: A. inopinatanus

Binomial name
- Archips inopinatanus (Kennel, 1901)

Synonyms
- Pandemis inopinatanus Kennel, 1901; Archips inopinatana

Species of moth

Archips inopinatanus is a species of moth of the family Tortricidae. It is found in Primorsky Krai in the Russian Far East.
