= Archips naltarica =

Scientific classification
- Kingdom: Animalia
- Phylum: Arthropoda
- Clade: Pancrustacea
- Class: Insecta
- Order: Lepidoptera
- Family: Tortricidae
- Genus: Archips
- Species: A. naltarica

Binomial name
- Archips naltarica Razowski, 2006

Species of moth

Archips naltarica is a species of moth of the family Tortricidae. It is found in India (Jammu and Kashmir).

The wingspan is about 23 millimetres (0.91 in) for females and about 20 mm for males.
