= Archips asiaticus =

Scientific classification
- Kingdom: Animalia
- Phylum: Arthropoda
- Clade: Pancrustacea
- Class: Insecta
- Order: Lepidoptera
- Family: Tortricidae
- Genus: Archips
- Species: A. asiaticus

Binomial name
- Archips asiaticus Walsingham, 1900

Synonyms
- Cacoecia contemptrix Meyrick, in Caradja, 1925

Species of moth

Archips asiaticus, the groundnut leafroller, is a species of moth of the family Tortricidae. It is found in Russia (Siberia), Korea, Japan and China (Heilongjiang, Jilin, Beijing, Gansu, Shandong, Jiangsu, Zhejiang, Anhui, Jiangxi, Hunan, Sichuan, Fujian).

The wingspan is about 18 mm. There are usually two to three generations per year with adults on wing from June to August. In Fujian, six generations per year have been recorded.

The larvae feed on the fruit and new leaves of Akebia quinata, Chloranthus serratus, Houttuynia cordata, Ipomoea aquatica, Malus baccata, Malus pumila, Prunus salicina, Prunus sargentii, Prunus tomentosa, Pyrus ussuriensis, Sinomenium acutum and Sorbus commixta. The species overwinters in the larval stage.
