= Archips viola =

Scientific classification
- Kingdom: Animalia
- Phylum: Arthropoda
- Clade: Pancrustacea
- Class: Insecta
- Order: Lepidoptera
- Family: Tortricidae
- Genus: Archips
- Species: A. viola

Binomial name
- Archips viola Falkovitsh, 1965

Synonyms
- Archips purpuratus Kawabe, 1965; Archips purpurata

Species of moth

Archips viola is a species of moth of the family Tortricidae. It is found in China (Heilongjiang), Korea, Japan, Russia (Primorye, Ussuri) and Central Asia.

The wingspan is 18–21 mm for males and 21–27 mm for females.

The larvae feed on Acer rufinerve, Alnus hirsuta, Populus sieboldii, Aralia mandschurica, Carpinus cordata, Corylus heterophylla, Juglans mandschurica, Lespedeza bicolor, Lonicera edulis, Pyrus ussuriensis, Quercus mongolica, Sorbaria sorbifolia, Syringa amurensis and Ulmus laciniata.
