= Archips abiephage =

Scientific classification
- Kingdom: Animalia
- Phylum: Arthropoda
- Clade: Pancrustacea
- Class: Insecta
- Order: Lepidoptera
- Family: Tortricidae
- Genus: Archips
- Species: A. abiephage

Binomial name
- Archips abiephage (Yasuda, 1975)

Synonyms
- Archippus abiephage Yasuda, 1975; Ariola abiephaga Issiki, in Issiki & Mutuura, 1962; Archips abiephagus Razowski, 1977

Species of moth

Archips abiephage is a species of moth of the family Tortricidae. It is found on the islands of Hokkaido and Honshu in Japan.

The wingspan is 18.5–23.5 mm.

The larvae feed on Abies concolor, Abies sachalinensis and Picea species.
