= Archips nigriplaganus =

Scientific classification
- Kingdom: Animalia
- Phylum: Arthropoda
- Clade: Pancrustacea
- Class: Insecta
- Order: Lepidoptera
- Family: Tortricidae
- Genus: Archips
- Species: A. nigriplaganus

Binomial name
- Archips nigriplaganus Franclemont, 1986

Synonyms
- Archips nigriplagana

Species of moth

Archips nigriplaganus is a species of moth of the family Tortricidae. It is found in North America, where it has been recorded from Kentucky, North Carolina, Quebec, Tennessee, Vermont and West Virginia.

The wingspan is about 19 mm. Adults have been recorded on wing from May to July.
