= Archips issiki =

Scientific classification
- Kingdom: Animalia
- Phylum: Arthropoda
- Clade: Pancrustacea
- Class: Insecta
- Order: Lepidoptera
- Family: Tortricidae
- Genus: Archips
- Species: A. issiki

Binomial name
- Archips issiki Kodma, 1960

Synonyms
- Archips abietis Falkovitsh, 1965; Archips issikii Yasuda, 1961

Species of moth

Archips issiki is a species of moth of the family Tortricidae. It is found in China (Heilongjiang, Liaoning, Shandong, Shaanxi, Xinjiang), South Korea, Japan and Russia (Ussuri, Primorye).

The wingspan is 16–18 mm (0.63–0.71 in) for males and 18.5–23.5 mm (0.73–0.93 in) for females.

The larvae feed on Abies concolor, Abies firma, Abies sachalinensis and Larix kaempferi.
