= Archips machlopis =

Scientific classification
- Kingdom: Animalia
- Phylum: Arthropoda
- Clade: Pancrustacea
- Class: Insecta
- Order: Lepidoptera
- Family: Tortricidae
- Genus: Archips
- Species: A. machlopis

Binomial name
- Archips machlopis (Meyrick, 1912)

Synonyms
- Cacoecia machlopis Meyrick, 1912; Cacoecia compacta Meyrick, 1918; Cacoecia isocyrta Meyrick, 1920; Cacoecia seminubila Meyrick, in de Joannis, 1930; Cacoecia transcutata Meyrick, 1935

Species of moth

Archips machlopis is a moth of the family Tortricidae. It is widely distributed in southern Asia (including Pakistan, Nepal, China, India, Burma, Thailand, Vietnam, Malaysia and Indonesia: Sumatra, Java).

The wingspan is 16–20 mm for males and 18–22 mm for females. In Malaysia, adults are on wing from July to November, in Indonesia the flight time is February and March, and from July to September.

The larvae feed on Medicago, Gloriosa superba, Cedrela toonica, Rumex, Citrus, Salix, Litchi and Camellia sinensis.
