= Archips pensilis =

Scientific classification
- Kingdom: Animalia
- Phylum: Arthropoda
- Clade: Pancrustacea
- Class: Insecta
- Order: Lepidoptera
- Family: Tortricidae
- Genus: Archips
- Species: A. pensilis

Binomial name
- Archips pensilis (Meyrick, 1920)

Synonyms
- Cacoecia pensilis Meyrick, 1920

Species of moth

Archips pensilis is a species of moth of the family Tortricidae. It is found in India.

The larvae feed on Citrus species, including Citrus aurantium.
