= Archips emitescens =

Scientific classification
- Kingdom: Animalia
- Phylum: Arthropoda
- Clade: Pancrustacea
- Class: Insecta
- Order: Lepidoptera
- Family: Tortricidae
- Genus: Archips
- Species: A. emitescens

Binomial name
- Archips emitescens (Meyrick, in de Joannis, 1930)

Synonyms
- Cacoecia emitescens Meyrick, in de Joannis, 1930

Species of moth

Archips emitescens is a species of moth of the family Tortricidae. It was described from Cho ganh, possibly referring to a location in Vietnam.
