= Archips expansus =

Scientific classification
- Kingdom: Animalia
- Phylum: Arthropoda
- Clade: Pancrustacea
- Class: Insecta
- Order: Lepidoptera
- Family: Tortricidae
- Genus: Archips
- Species: A. expansus

Binomial name
- Archips expansus (Diakonoff, 1941)

Synonyms
- Cacoecia expansa Diakonoff, 1941; Archips expansa; Archips aperta Diakonoff, 1968

Species of moth

Archips expansus is a species of moth of the family Tortricidae. It is found on Java and the Philippines.
