= Archips dissitanus =

Scientific classification
- Kingdom: Animalia
- Phylum: Arthropoda
- Clade: Pancrustacea
- Class: Insecta
- Order: Lepidoptera
- Family: Tortricidae
- Genus: Archips
- Species: A. dissitanus

Binomial name
- Archips dissitanus (Grote, 1879)

Synonyms
- Tortrix (Ptycholoma) dissitana Grote, 1879; Archips dissitana

Species of moth

Archips dissitanus, the boldly-marked archips moth, is a species of moth of the family Tortricidae. It is found in North America, where it has been recorded from Alberta to Nova Scotia and south to Minnesota and North Carolina in the Appalachian Mountains. The habitat consists of boreal forests.

The wingspan is about 24 mm. Adults have been recorded on wing from mid-June to late August.

The larvae feed on Abies balsamea and Picea glauca.
