= Archips cantinus =

Scientific classification
- Kingdom: Animalia
- Phylum: Arthropoda
- Clade: Pancrustacea
- Class: Insecta
- Order: Lepidoptera
- Family: Tortricidae
- Genus: Archips
- Species: A. cantinus

Binomial name
- Archips cantinus Razowski, 2006

Species of moth

Archips cantinus is a moth of the family Tortricidae. It is found in Kashmir.

The wingspan is about 24 millimetres (0.94 in).
