= Archips audax =

Scientific classification
- Kingdom: Animalia
- Phylum: Arthropoda
- Clade: Pancrustacea
- Class: Insecta
- Order: Lepidoptera
- Family: Tortricidae
- Genus: Archips
- Species: A. audax

Binomial name
- Archips audax Razowski, 1977

Species of moth

Archips audax is a species of moth of the family Tortricidae. It is found on the island of Honshu in Japan.

The moth is 17–25 mm for males and 21–30 mm for females.

The larvae feed on Quercus acutissima, Quercus serrata, Quercus variabilis, Abies, Castanea and Larix species.
