= Archips euryplinthus =

Scientific classification
- Kingdom: Animalia
- Phylum: Arthropoda
- Clade: Pancrustacea
- Class: Insecta
- Order: Lepidoptera
- Family: Tortricidae
- Genus: Archips
- Species: A. euryplinthus

Binomial name
- Archips euryplinthus (Meyrick, 1923)

Synonyms
- Cacoecia euryplintha Meyrick, 1923; Archips euryplintha

Species of moth

Archips euryplinthus is a species of moth of the family Tortricidae. It is found in India.

The larvae feed on Malus species.
