= Archips strigopterus =

Scientific classification
- Kingdom: Animalia
- Phylum: Arthropoda
- Clade: Pancrustacea
- Class: Insecta
- Order: Lepidoptera
- Family: Tortricidae
- Genus: Archips
- Species: A. strigopterus

Binomial name
- Archips strigopterus Liu, 1987

Species of moth

Archips strigopterus is a species of moth of the family Tortricidae. It is found in Sichuan, China.

The length of the forewings is 10–11 mm for males and about 11 mm for females.
