= Archips subsidiarius =

Scientific classification
- Kingdom: Animalia
- Phylum: Arthropoda
- Clade: Pancrustacea
- Class: Insecta
- Order: Lepidoptera
- Family: Tortricidae
- Genus: Archips
- Species: A. subsidiarius

Binomial name
- Archips subsidiarius (Meyrick, 1924)

Synonyms
- Cacoecia subsidiaria Meyrick, 1924; Archips subsidiaria

Species of moth

Archips subsidiarius is a moth of the family Tortricidae. It is found in Vietnam and Kashmir, India.
