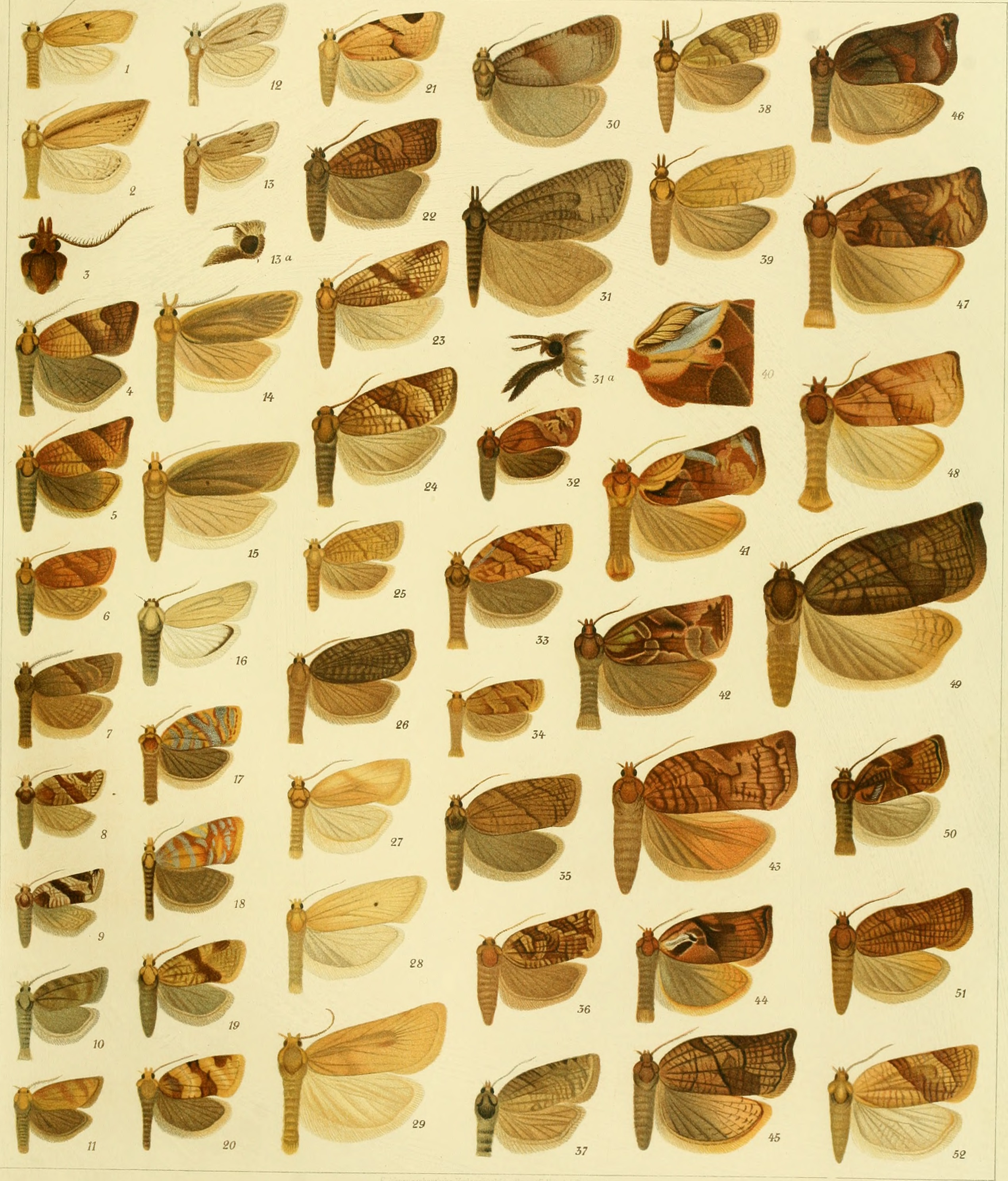
- Archips ingentanus in Kennel Die palaearktischen tortriciden figures 47 male, 49 female

Scientific classification
- Domain: Eukaryota
- Kingdom: Animalia
- Phylum: Arthropoda
- Class: Insecta
- Order: Lepidoptera
- Family: Tortricidae
- Genus: Archips
- Species: A. ingentanus

Binomial name
- Archips ingentanus (Christoph, 1881)

Synonyms
- Tortrix ingentana Christoph, 1881; Archips ingentana

= Archips ingentanus =

Species of moth

Archips ingentanus is a species of moth of the family Tortricidae. It is found in China (Heilongjiang), Korea, Japan and Russia (Ussuri, Amur, Sakhalin, Primorye, Kuril Islands).

The wingspan is 19–26 mm for males and 25–34 mm for females.

The larvae feed on Abies firma, Abies nephrolepis, Camellia, Malus pumila, Pyrus, Quercus, Artemisia lavandulaefolia, Ipomoea aquatica, Petasites, Urtica, Plantago asiatica and Lilium species.
