= Archips alberta =

Scientific classification
- Kingdom: Animalia
- Phylum: Arthropoda
- Clade: Pancrustacea
- Class: Insecta
- Order: Lepidoptera
- Family: Tortricidae
- Genus: Archips
- Species: A. alberta

Binomial name
- Archips alberta (McDunnough, 1923)

Synonyms
- Tortrix alberta McDunnough, 1923

Species of moth

Archips alberta is a species of moth of the family Tortricidae first described by James Halliday McDunnough in 1923. It is found in North America, where it has been recorded across boreal Canada, south through the mountains to Utah. The habitat consists of coniferous forests.

The wingspan is 22–25 mm. Adults are on wing from early July to mid-August.

The larvae feed on Picea mariana, Picea glauca and Picea engelmannii.
