= Archips stellatus =

Scientific classification
- Domain: Eukaryota
- Kingdom: Animalia
- Phylum: Arthropoda
- Class: Insecta
- Order: Lepidoptera
- Family: Tortricidae
- Genus: Archips
- Species: A. stellatus

Binomial name
- Archips stellatus Jinbo, 2006

Synonyms
- Archips stellata

Species of moth

Archips stellatus is a species of moth of the family Tortricidae that is endemic to Japan.
