= Archips myrrhophanes =

Scientific classification
- Kingdom: Animalia
- Phylum: Arthropoda
- Clade: Pancrustacea
- Class: Insecta
- Order: Lepidoptera
- Family: Tortricidae
- Genus: Archips
- Species: A. myrrhophanes

Binomial name
- Archips myrrhophanes (Meyrick, in Caradja, 1931)

Synonyms
- Tortriz myrrhophanes Meyrick, in Caradja, 1931; Archips adornatus Liu, 1987; Archips sayonae Kawabe, 1985

Species of moth

Archips myrrhophanes is a species of moth of the family Tortricidae. It is found in China (Sichuan, Zhejiang, Jiangxi, Fujian, Zhejiang) and Taiwan.

The length of the forewings is 7–10 mm for males and 9–11 mm for females.
