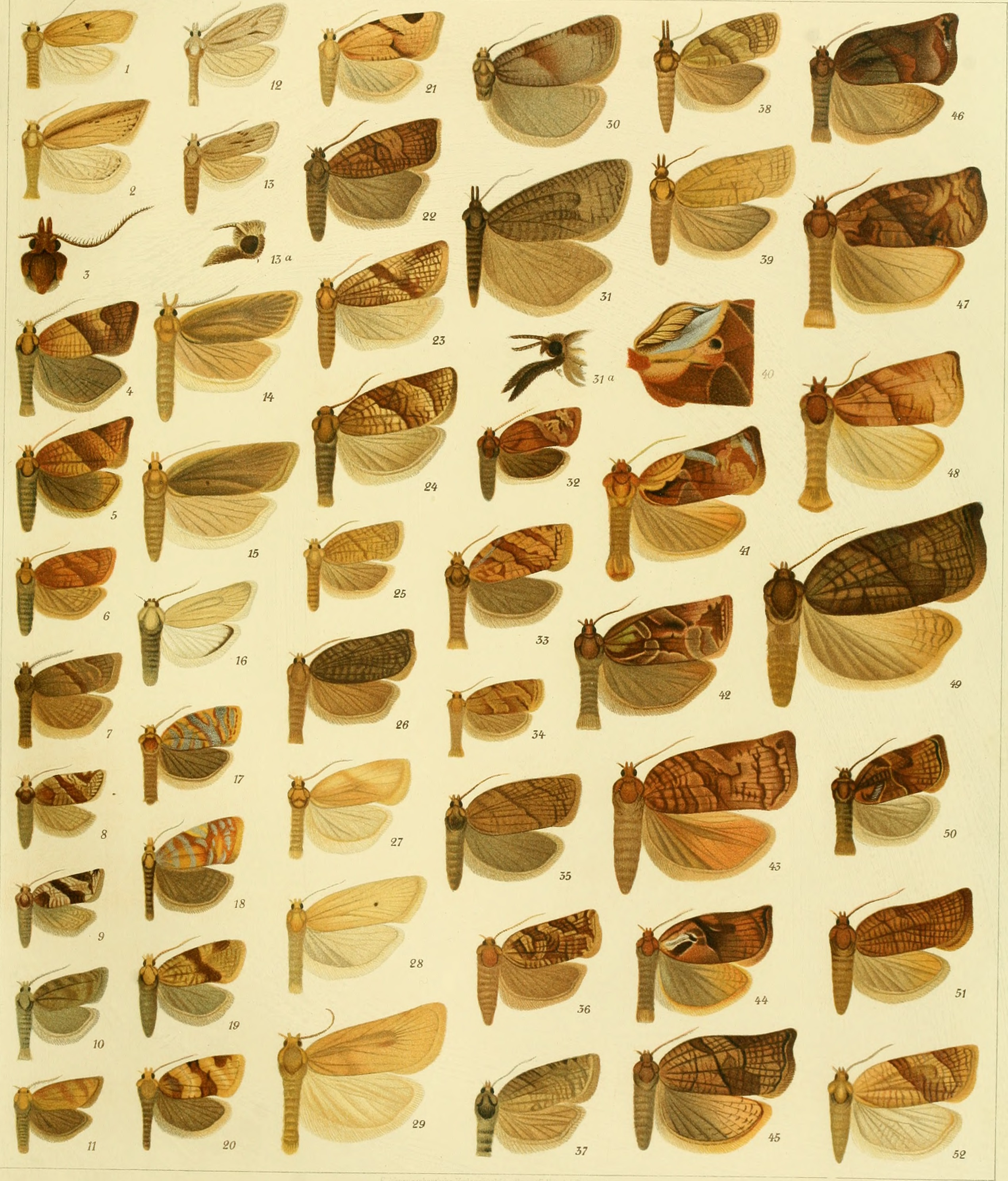
- Archips subrufanus in Kennel Die palaearktischen tortriciden figures 48 male

Scientific classification
- Kingdom: Animalia
- Phylum: Arthropoda
- Class: Insecta
- Order: Lepidoptera
- Family: Tortricidae
- Genus: Archips
- Species: A. subrufanus

Binomial name
- Archips subrufanus (Snellen, 1883)

Synonyms
- Tortrix subrufana Snellen, 1883; Archips subrufana; Archippus coreensis Park, 1976

= Archips subrufanus =

Species of moth

Archips subrufanus is a species of moth of the family Tortricidae. It is found in China (Heilongjiang, Jilin), Korea, Japan and Russia (Primorye).

The wingspan is about 11 mm. Adults are on wing from July to mid-September.

The larvae are probably polyphagous.
