= Archips tharsaleopus =

Scientific classification
- Kingdom: Animalia
- Phylum: Arthropoda
- Clade: Pancrustacea
- Class: Insecta
- Order: Lepidoptera
- Family: Tortricidae
- Genus: Archips
- Species: A. tharsaleopus

Binomial name
- Archips tharsaleopus (Meyrick, in Caradja & Meyrick, 1935)

Synonyms
- Cacoecia tharsaleopa Meyrick, in Caradja & Meyrick, 1935; Archips tharsaleopa; Archips yunnanus Razowski, 1977

Species of moth

Archips tharsaleopus is a species of moth of the family Tortricidae. It is found in Zhejiang and Yunnan, China.

The length of the forewings is about 10 mm.

== Subspecies ==
- Archips tharsaleopus tharsaleopus (China: Chekiang)
- Archips tharsaleopus weixiensis Liu, 1987 (China: Yunnan)
- Archips tharsaleopus yunnanus Razowski, 1977 (China: Yunnan)
