= Archips pachyvalvus =

Scientific classification
- Kingdom: Animalia
- Phylum: Arthropoda
- Clade: Pancrustacea
- Class: Insecta
- Order: Lepidoptera
- Family: Tortricidae
- Genus: Archips
- Species: A. pachyvalvus

Binomial name
- Archips pachyvalvus Liu, 1987

Species of moth

Archips pachyvalvus is a species of moth of the family Tortricidae.

== Distribution ==
It is found in Sichuan, China.

== Description ==
The length of the forewings is 10–11 mm for males and about 12 mm for females.
