= Archips alcmaeonis =

Scientific classification
- Kingdom: Animalia
- Phylum: Arthropoda
- Clade: Pancrustacea
- Class: Insecta
- Order: Lepidoptera
- Family: Tortricidae
- Genus: Archips
- Species: A. alcmaeonis

Binomial name
- Archips alcmaeonis (Meyrick, 1928)

Synonyms
- Cacoecia alcmaeonis Meyrick, 1928

Species of moth

Archips alcmaeonis is a species of moth of the family Tortricidae. It is found in Assam, India.
