= Archips subgyraleus =

Scientific classification
- Kingdom: Animalia
- Phylum: Arthropoda
- Clade: Pancrustacea
- Class: Insecta
- Order: Lepidoptera
- Family: Tortricidae
- Genus: Archips
- Species: A. subgyraleus

Binomial name
- Archips subgyraleus Razowski, 2009

Species of moth

Archips subgyraleus is a moth of the family Tortricidae. It is found in Vietnam.
