= Archips vivesi =

Scientific classification
- Kingdom: Animalia
- Phylum: Arthropoda
- Clade: Pancrustacea
- Class: Insecta
- Order: Lepidoptera
- Family: Tortricidae
- Genus: Archips
- Species: A. vivesi

Binomial name
- Archips vivesi Razowski, 2009

Species of moth

Archips vivesi is a moth of the family Tortricidae. It is found in Vietnam.

The wingspan is 18 mm.
