= Archips opiparus =

Scientific classification
- Kingdom: Animalia
- Phylum: Arthropoda
- Clade: Pancrustacea
- Class: Insecta
- Order: Lepidoptera
- Family: Tortricidae
- Genus: Archips
- Species: A. opiparus

Binomial name
- Archips opiparus Liu, 1987

Species of moth

Archips opiparus is a species of moth of the family Tortricidae. It is found in the Chinese provinces of Guizhou, Hunan, Sichuan and Yunnan.

The length of the forewings is 8–10 mm for males and about 8 mm for females.
