= Archips tsuganus =

Scientific classification
- Kingdom: Animalia
- Phylum: Arthropoda
- Clade: Pancrustacea
- Class: Insecta
- Order: Lepidoptera
- Family: Tortricidae
- Genus: Archips
- Species: A. tsuganus

Binomial name
- Archips tsuganus (Powell, 1962)

Synonyms
- Archippus tsuganus Powell, 1962

Species of moth

Archips tsuganus is a species of moth of the family Tortricidae. It is found in North America, where it has been recorded from Alberta, British Columbia, Colorado and North Carolina.

Adults have been recorded on wing from June to September.

The larvae feed on Tsuga species.
