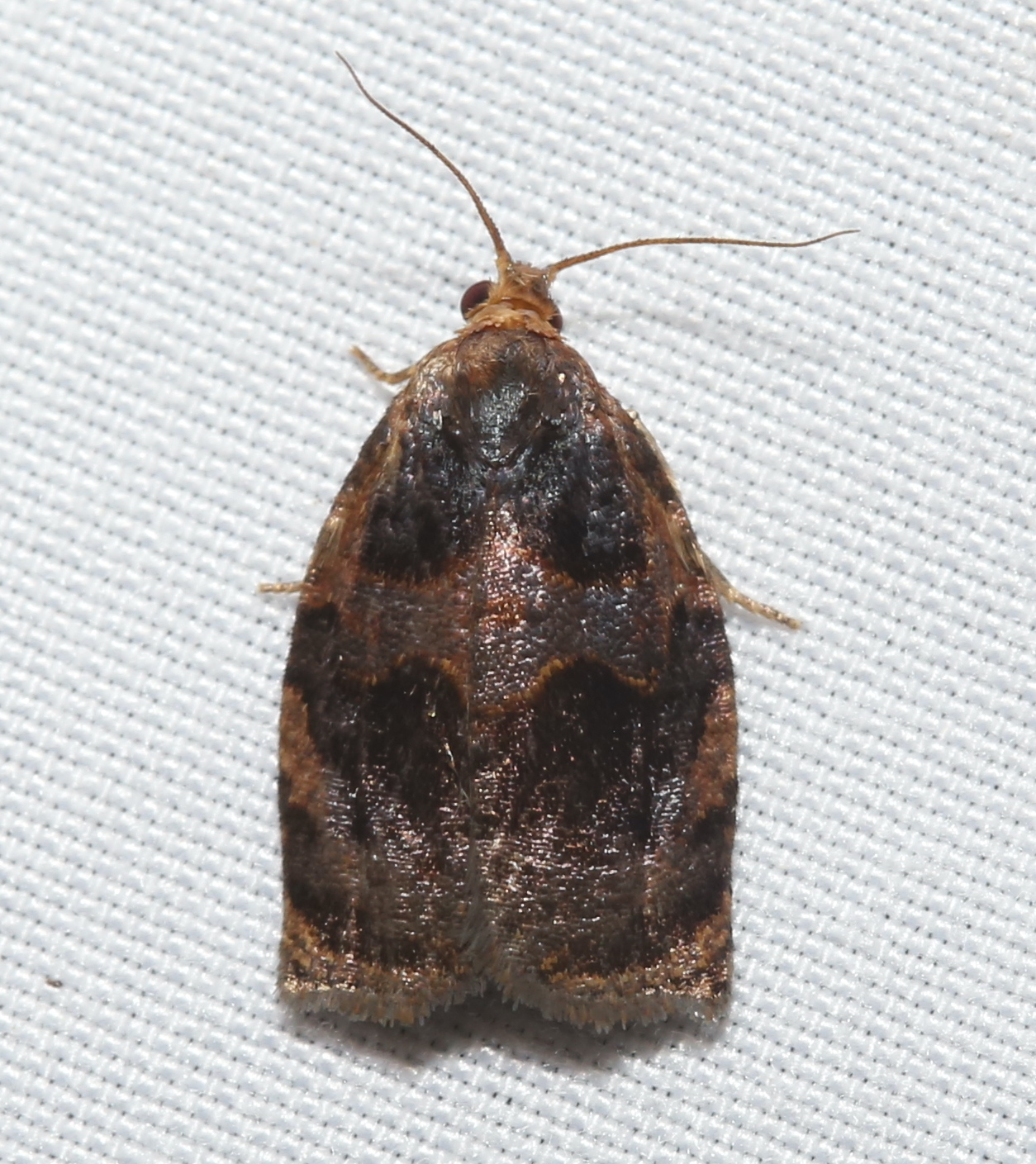

Scientific classification
- Kingdom: Animalia
- Phylum: Arthropoda
- Clade: Pancrustacea
- Class: Insecta
- Order: Lepidoptera
- Family: Tortricidae
- Genus: Archips
- Species: A. infumatanus

Binomial name
- Archips infumatanus (Zeller, 1875)

Synonyms
- Tortrix infumatana Zeller, 1875; Archips infumatana

= Archips infumatanus =

Species of moth

Archips infumatanus, the smoked leafroller moth or hickory webworm, is a species of moth of the family Tortricidae. It is found in North America, where it has been recorded from Quebec and Ontario south to Florida and west to Texas and Iowa.

The wingspan is 17–21 mm. Adults are on wing from June to July.

The larvae feed on Juglans and Carya species.
