= Archips carteri =

Scientific classification
- Kingdom: Animalia
- Phylum: Arthropoda
- Clade: Pancrustacea
- Class: Insecta
- Order: Lepidoptera
- Family: Tortricidae
- Genus: Archips
- Species: A. carteri

Binomial name
- Archips carteri Rose & Pooni, 2004

Species of moth

Archips carteri is a species of moth of the family Tortricidae. It is found in Himachal Pradesh, India.
