= Archips fraterna =

Scientific classification
- Kingdom: Animalia
- Phylum: Arthropoda
- Clade: Pancrustacea
- Class: Insecta
- Order: Lepidoptera
- Family: Tortricidae
- Genus: Archips
- Species: A. fraterna

Binomial name
- Archips fraterna Tuck, 1990

Species of moth

Archips fraterna is a moth of the family Tortricidae. It is found in Pakistan, Java and northern Borneo.

The larvae have been recorded feeding on Glycine max and Coffea librica.
