= Archips meridionalis =

Scientific classification
- Kingdom: Animalia
- Phylum: Arthropoda
- Clade: Pancrustacea
- Class: Insecta
- Order: Lepidoptera
- Family: Tortricidae
- Genus: Archips
- Species: A. meridionalis

Binomial name
- Archips meridionalis Yasuda & Kawabe, 1980

Species of moth

Archips meridionalis is a species of moth of the family Tortricidae. It is found in Japan.

The wingspan is 16–18 mm for males and 19–23 mm for females.
