= Archips taiwanensis =

Scientific classification
- Kingdom: Animalia
- Phylum: Arthropoda
- Clade: Pancrustacea
- Class: Insecta
- Order: Lepidoptera
- Family: Tortricidae
- Genus: Archips
- Species: A. taiwanensis

Binomial name
- Archips taiwanensis Kawabe, 1985

Species of moth

Archips taiwanensis is a moth of the family Tortricidae. It is found in Taiwan.
