= Archips menotoma =

Scientific classification
- Kingdom: Animalia
- Phylum: Arthropoda
- Clade: Pancrustacea
- Class: Insecta
- Order: Lepidoptera
- Family: Tortricidae
- Genus: Archips
- Species: A. menotoma

Binomial name
- Archips menotoma (Meyrick, 1937)

Synonyms
- Cacoecia menotoma Meyrick, 1937

Species of moth

Archips menotoma is a species of moth of the family Tortricidae. It is found in Yunnan, China.
