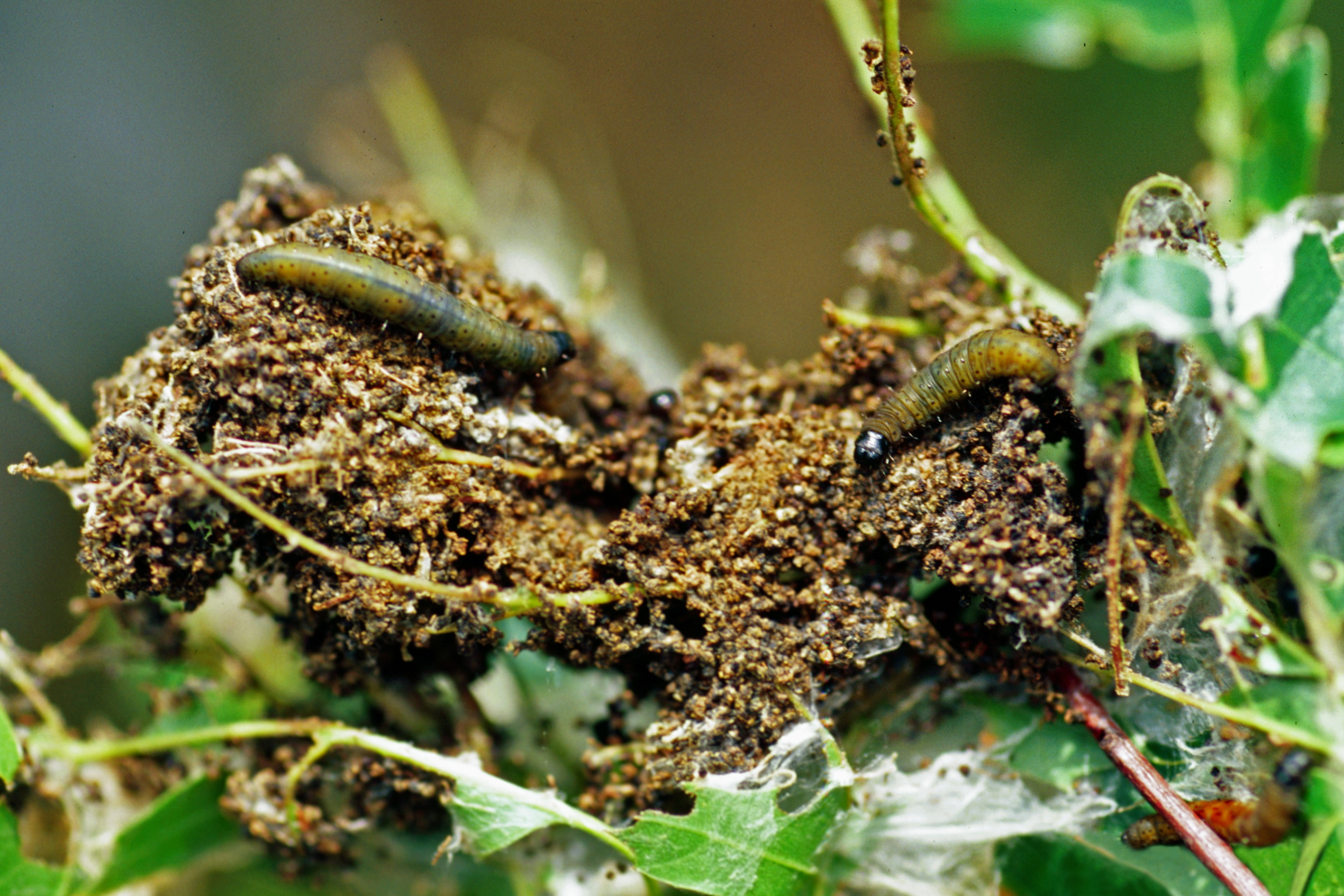

Scientific classification
- Kingdom: Animalia
- Phylum: Arthropoda
- Clade: Pancrustacea
- Class: Insecta
- Order: Lepidoptera
- Family: Tortricidae
- Genus: Archips
- Species: A. fervidana

Binomial name
- Archips fervidana (Clemens, 1860)

Synonyms
- Lozotaenia fervidana Clemens, 1860; Tortrix palludana Beutenmuller, 1892; Tortrix paludana Robinson, 1869

= Archips fervidana =

Oak webworm moth

Species of moth

Archips fervidana, the oak webworm moth, is a moth of the family Tortricidae. It is found from Maine and Quebec to North Carolina, west to Wisconsin and Arkansas.

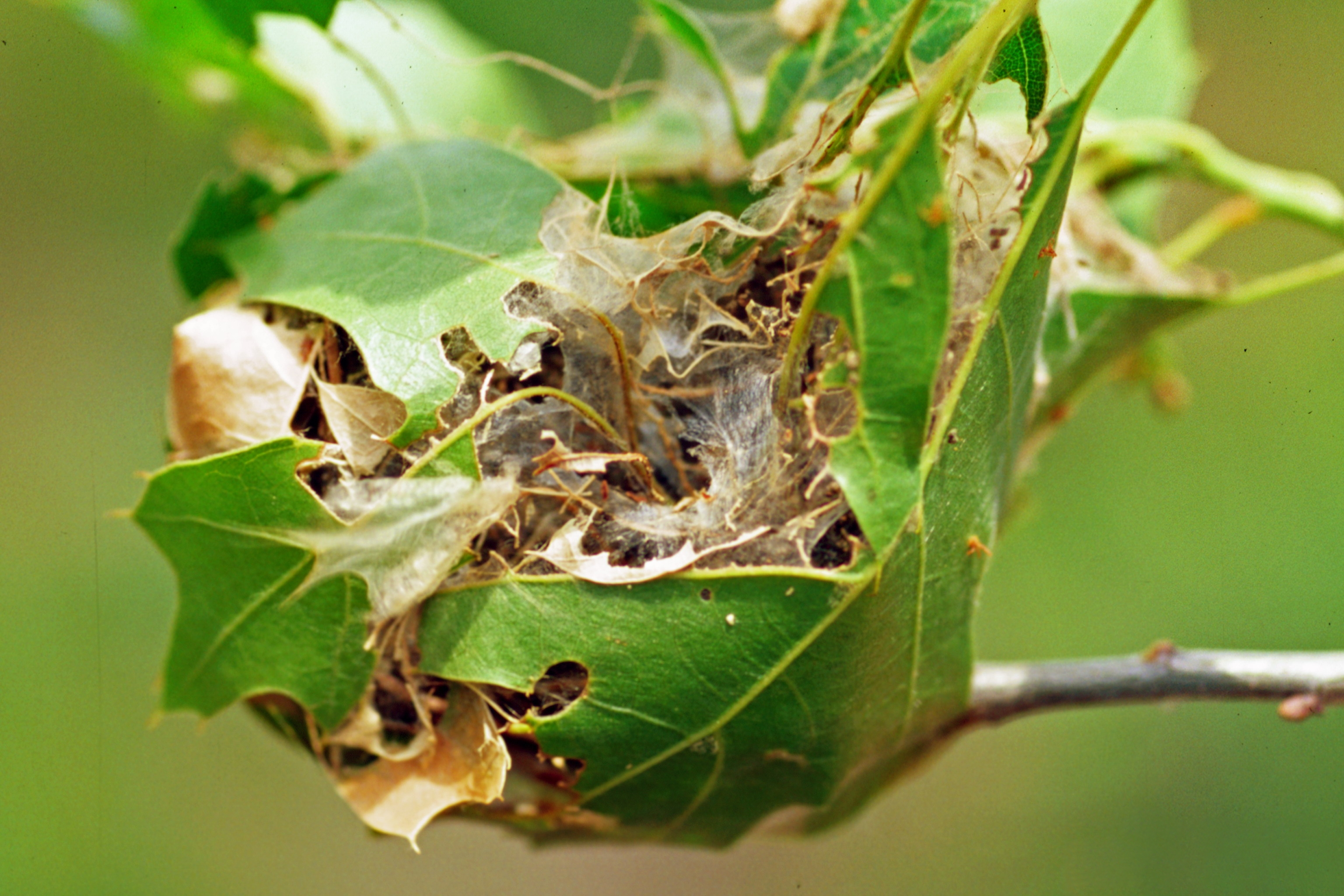
Damage

The wingspan is 18–25 mm.

The larvae feed on Carya and Quercus species.
