= Archips gyraleus =

Scientific classification
- Kingdom: Animalia
- Phylum: Arthropoda
- Clade: Pancrustacea
- Class: Insecta
- Order: Lepidoptera
- Family: Tortricidae
- Genus: Archips
- Species: A. gyraleus

Binomial name
- Archips gyraleus Diakonoff, 1982

Synonyms
- Cacoecia micaceana Diakonoff, 1941; Archips seminubilus Razowsky, 1976

Species of moth

Archips gyraleus is a species of moth of the family Tortricidae first described by Alexey Diakonoff in 1982. It is found in Sri Lanka.
