= Archips strojny =

Scientific classification
- Kingdom: Animalia
- Phylum: Arthropoda
- Clade: Pancrustacea
- Class: Insecta
- Order: Lepidoptera
- Family: Tortricidae
- Genus: Archips
- Species: A. strojny

Binomial name
- Archips strojny Razowski, 1977

Species of moth

Archips strojny is a species of moth of the family Tortricidae. It is found in Hunan, China.
