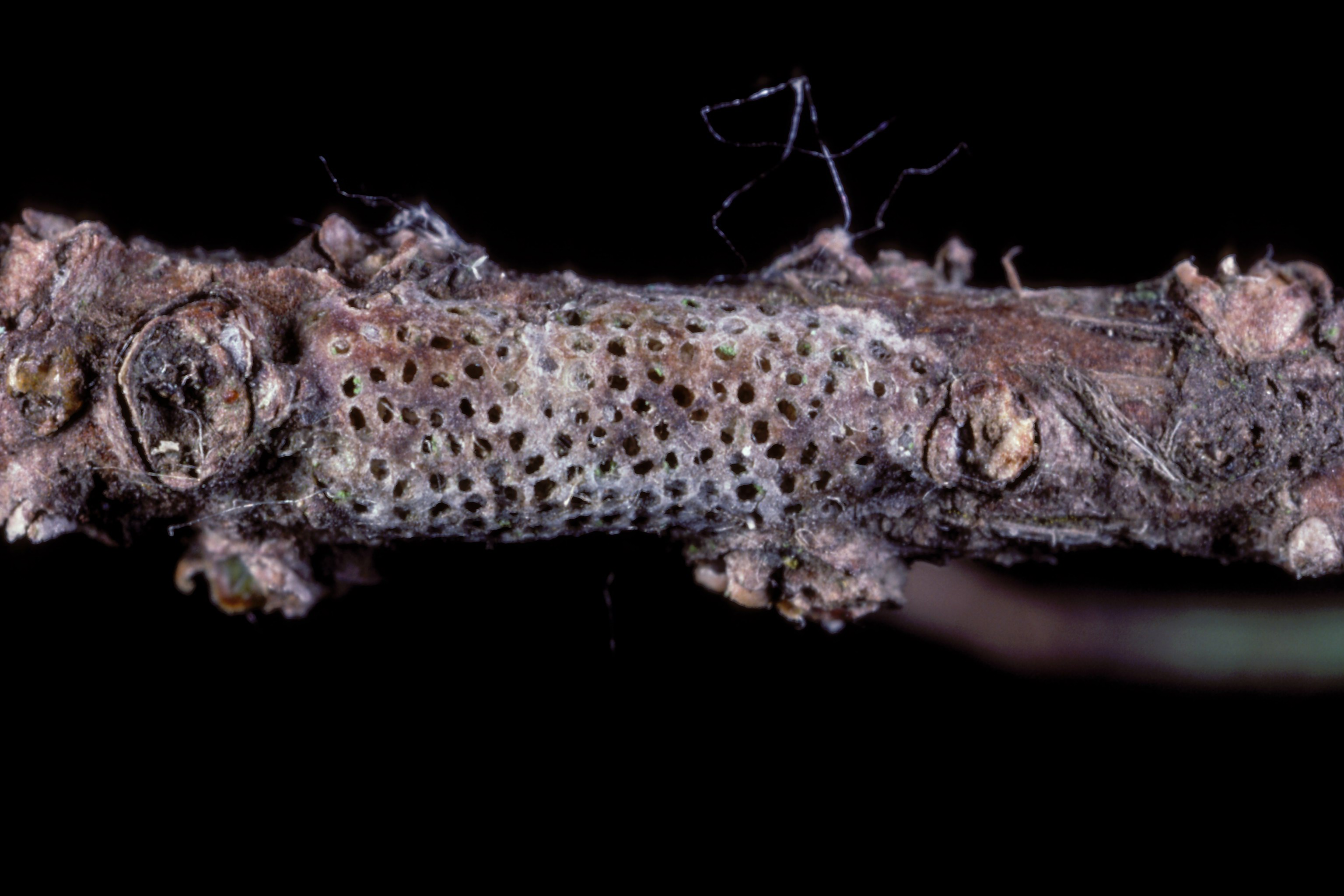
- Adults (top) and eggs (bottom)

Scientific classification
- Kingdom: Animalia
- Phylum: Arthropoda
- Clade: Pancrustacea
- Class: Insecta
- Order: Lepidoptera
- Family: Tortricidae
- Genus: Archips
- Species: A. goyerana

Binomial name
- Archips goyerana Kruse, 2000

= Archips goyerana =

Baldcypress leafroller

Species of moth

Archips goyerana, the baldcypress leafroller, is a species of moth in the family Tortricidae.

== Distribution ==
It is known from southern Louisiana and south-western Mississippi. It originally may have been endemic to forested wetlands, but has undergone a population explosion and expansion of its range since 1983.

== Description ==
The length of the forewings is 6.8–8.5 mm for males and 8–10 mm for females.

== Biology ==
The larvae feed on Taxodium distichum and are considered a serious pest of that tree species.
