= Archips magnificus =

Scientific classification
- Kingdom: Animalia
- Phylum: Arthropoda
- Clade: Pancrustacea
- Class: Insecta
- Order: Lepidoptera
- Family: Tortricidae
- Genus: Archips
- Species: A. magnificus

Binomial name
- Archips magnificus Tuck, 1990

Synonyms
- Archips magnifica

Species of moth

Archips magnificus is a species of moth of the family Tortricidae. It is found on Sabah in Malaysia.
