= Archips kangraensis =

Scientific classification
- Kingdom: Animalia
- Phylum: Arthropoda
- Clade: Pancrustacea
- Class: Insecta
- Order: Lepidoptera
- Family: Tortricidae
- Genus: Archips
- Species: A. kangraensis

Binomial name
- Archips kangraensis Rose & Pooni, 2004

Species of moth

Archips kangraensis is a species of moth of the family Tortricidae. It is found in Himachal Pradesh, India.
