= Archips alleni =

Scientific classification
- Kingdom: Animalia
- Phylum: Arthropoda
- Clade: Pancrustacea
- Class: Insecta
- Order: Lepidoptera
- Family: Tortricidae
- Genus: Archips
- Species: A. alleni

Binomial name
- Archips alleni Tuck, 1990

Species of moth

Archips alleni is a species of moth of the family Tortricidae. It is found in Thailand.
