= Archips atrolucens =

Scientific classification
- Kingdom: Animalia
- Phylum: Arthropoda
- Clade: Pancrustacea
- Class: Insecta
- Order: Lepidoptera
- Family: Tortricidae
- Genus: Archips
- Species: A. atrolucens

Binomial name
- Archips atrolucens (Diakonoff, 1941)

Synonyms
- Cacoecia atrolucens Diakonoff, 1941

Species of moth

Archips atrolucens is a species of moth of the family Tortricidae. It is found on Java in Indonesia.

The larvae feed on Euodia species and Melia azedarach.
