= Archips eleagnanus =

Scientific classification
- Kingdom: Animalia
- Phylum: Arthropoda
- Clade: Pancrustacea
- Class: Insecta
- Order: Lepidoptera
- Family: Tortricidae
- Genus: Archips
- Species: A. eleagnanus

Binomial name
- Archips eleagnanus (McDunnough, 1923)

Synonyms
- Cacoecia eleagnana McDunnough, 1923; Archips eleagnana

Species of moth

Archips eleagnanus is a species of moth of the family Tortricidae first described by James Halliday McDunnough in 1923. It is found in North America, where it has been recorded from Alberta, Manitoba, Saskatchewan, Wyoming and New Mexico. The habitat consists of prairies and montane areas.

The wingspan is about 20 mm. Adults are on wing from the end of June to early August.

The larvae feed on Eleagnus species.
