= Archips paredraea =

Scientific classification
- Kingdom: Animalia
- Phylum: Arthropoda
- Clade: Pancrustacea
- Class: Insecta
- Order: Lepidoptera
- Family: Tortricidae
- Genus: Archips
- Species: A. paredraea

Binomial name
- Archips paredraea (Meyrick, 1931)

Synonyms
- Cacoecia paredraea Meyrick, 1931; Archips paredreus Razowski, 1977

Species of moth

Archips paredraea is a moth of the family Tortricidae. It is found in Taiwan.
