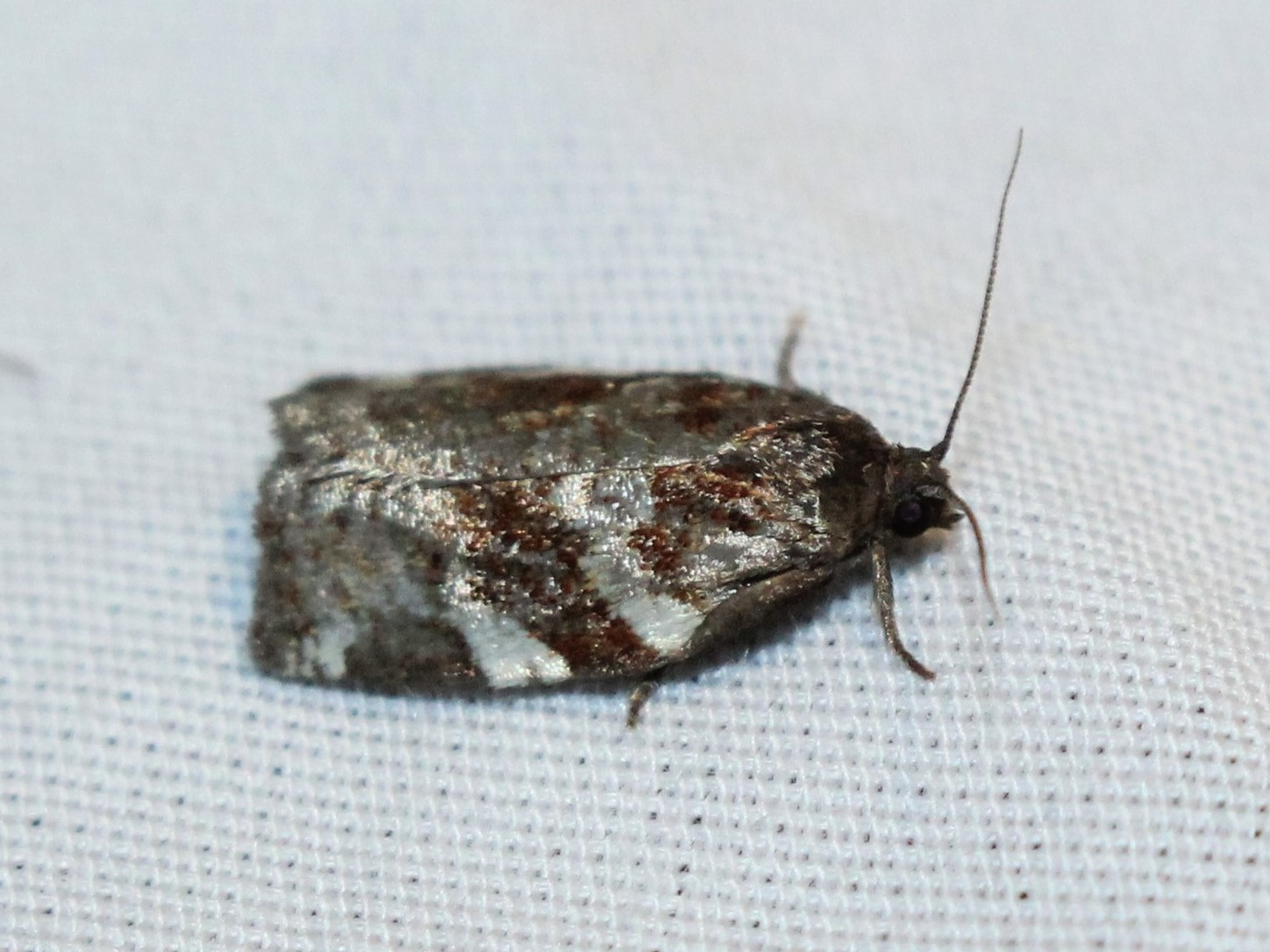

Scientific classification
- Kingdom: Animalia
- Phylum: Arthropoda
- Clade: Pancrustacea
- Class: Insecta
- Order: Lepidoptera
- Family: Tortricidae
- Genus: Archips
- Species: A. mortuanus

Binomial name
- Archips mortuanus (Kearfott, 1907)

Synonyms
- Cacoecia mortuana Kearfott, 1907; Archips mortuana

= Archips mortuanus =

Species of moth

Archips mortuanus, the dusky-back leaf roller, is a species of moth of the family Tortricidae. It is found in eastern North America, where it has been recorded from Maine, Michigan and New York.

The length of the forewings is 7–9 mm. Adults are on wing from June to July in one generation per year.

The larvae feed on the leaves of Prunus virginiana, Populus balsamifera, Populus tremuloides, Cicuta, Alnus, Malus, Spiraea, Salix (including Salix bebbiana) and Crataegus species. They reach a length of 14–22 mm. The species overwinters as an egg.
