= Archips crassifolianus =

Scientific classification
- Kingdom: Animalia
- Phylum: Arthropoda
- Clade: Pancrustacea
- Class: Insecta
- Order: Lepidoptera
- Family: Tortricidae
- Genus: Archips
- Species: A. crassifolianus

Binomial name
- Archips crassifolianus Liu, 1990

Species of moth

Archips crassifolianus is a species of moth of the family Tortricidae. It is found in Gansu, China.

The length of the forewings is 9–10 mm for males and 8–11 mm for females.

The larvae feed on Picea crassifolia.
