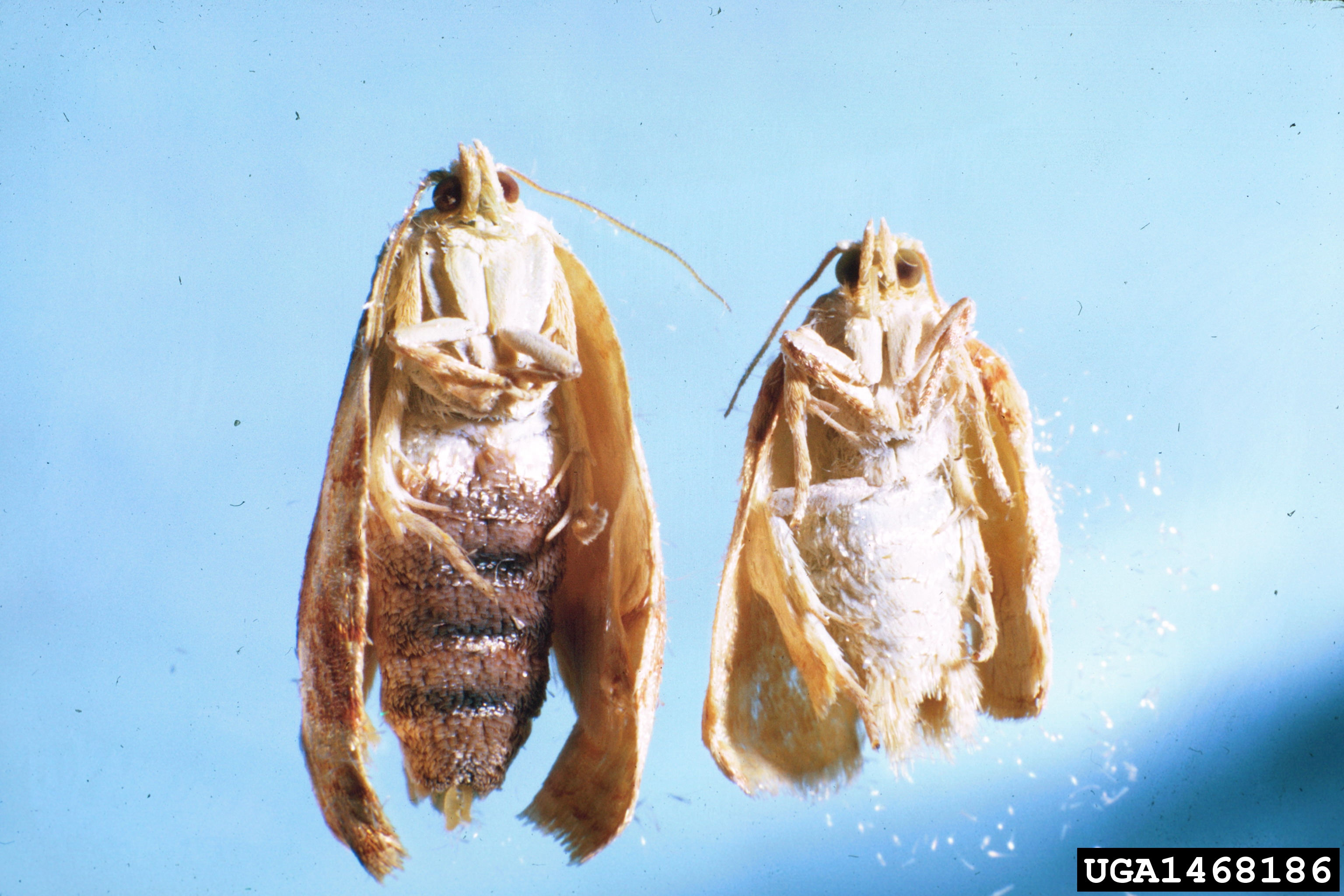

Scientific classification
- Kingdom: Animalia
- Phylum: Arthropoda
- Clade: Pancrustacea
- Class: Insecta
- Order: Lepidoptera
- Family: Tortricidae
- Genus: Archips
- Species: A. negundana

Binomial name
- Archips negundana (Dyar, 1902)

Synonyms
- Cacoecia negundana Dyar, 1902; Cacoecia nugundana Dyar, 1902

= Archips negundana =

Species of moth

Archips negundana, the larger boxelder leafroller, is a moth of the family Tortricidae. The species was first described by Harrison Gray Dyar Jr. in 1902. It is found in North America from southern British Columbia to southern Quebec, south to California and Florida.

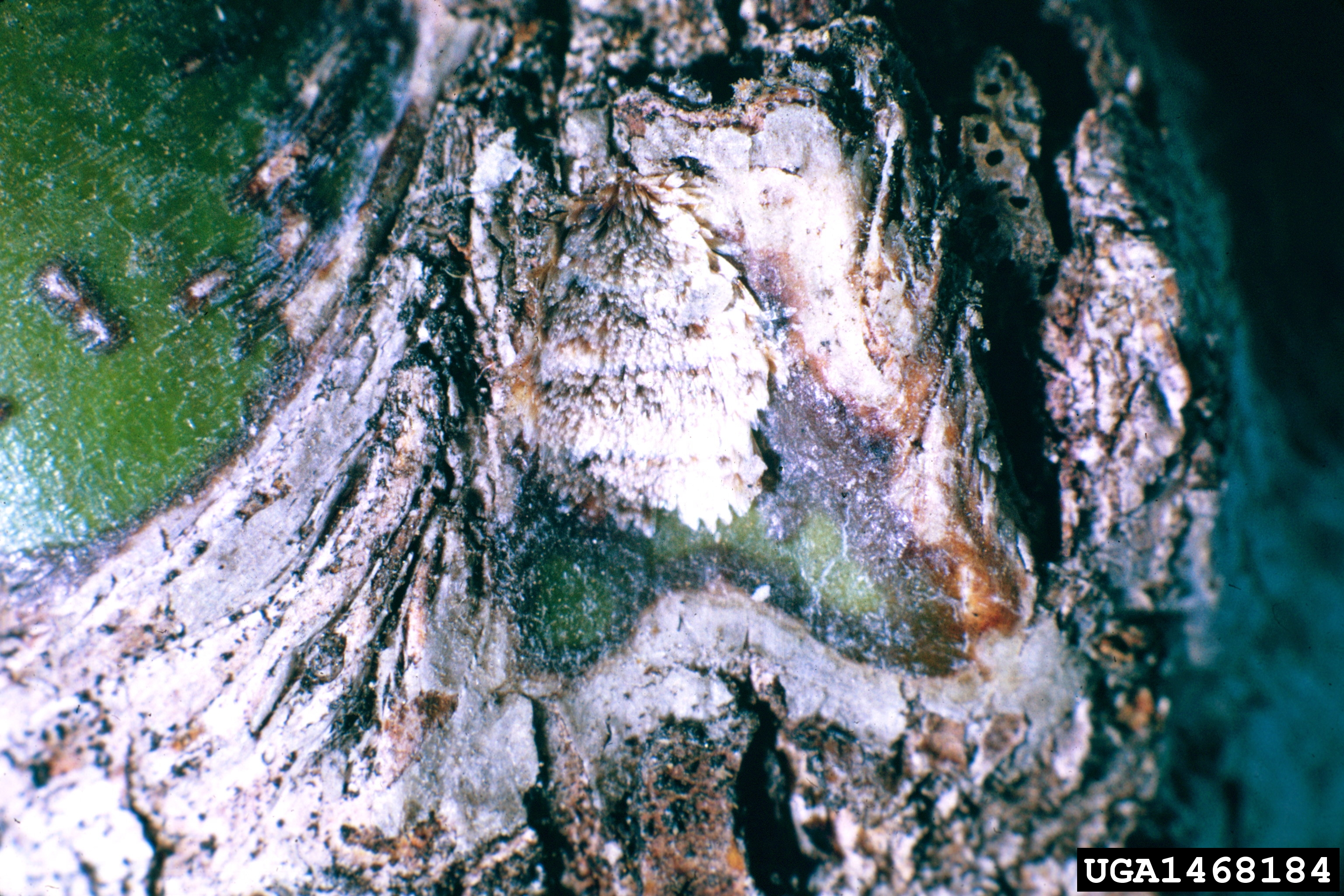
Egg

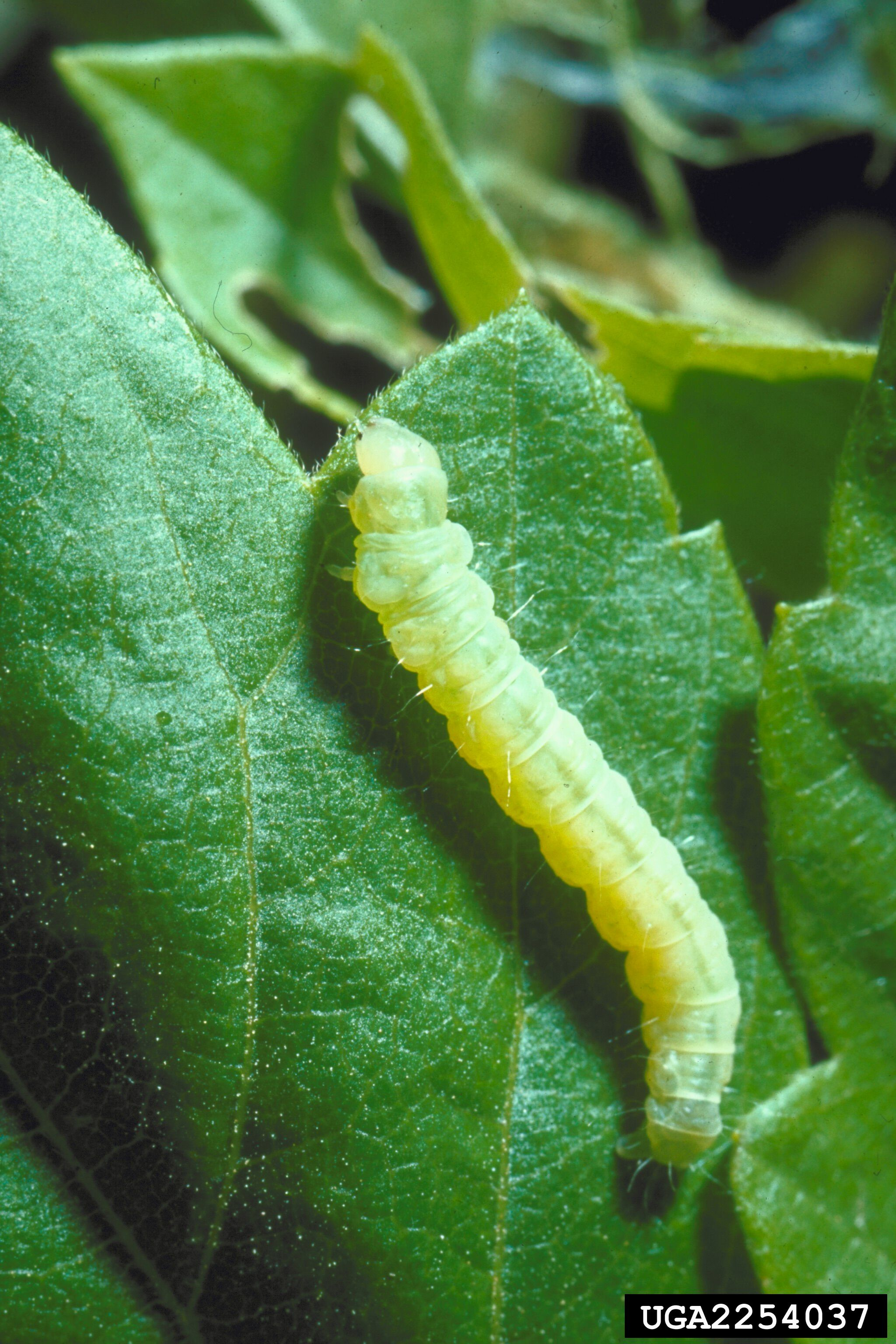
Larva

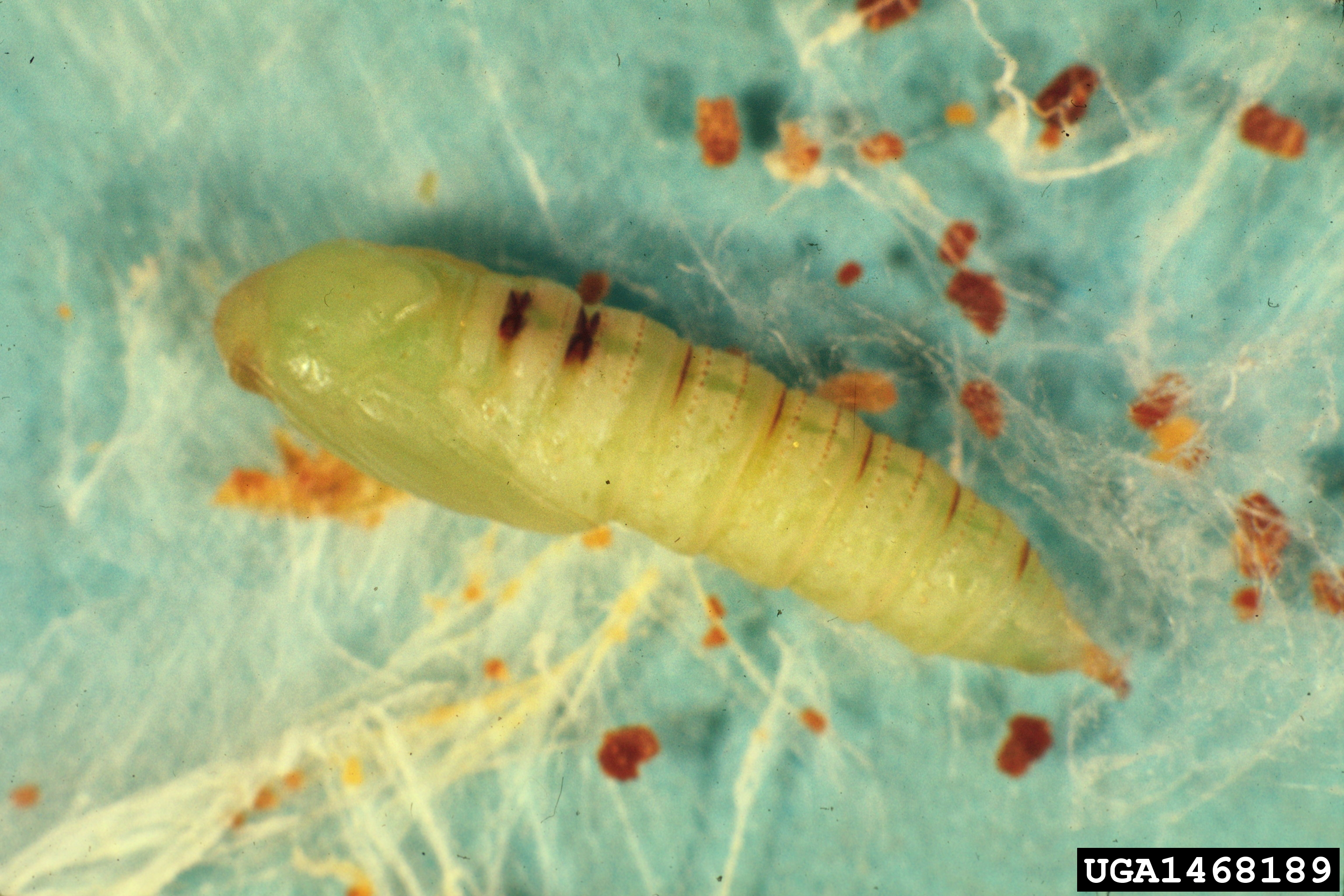
Pupa

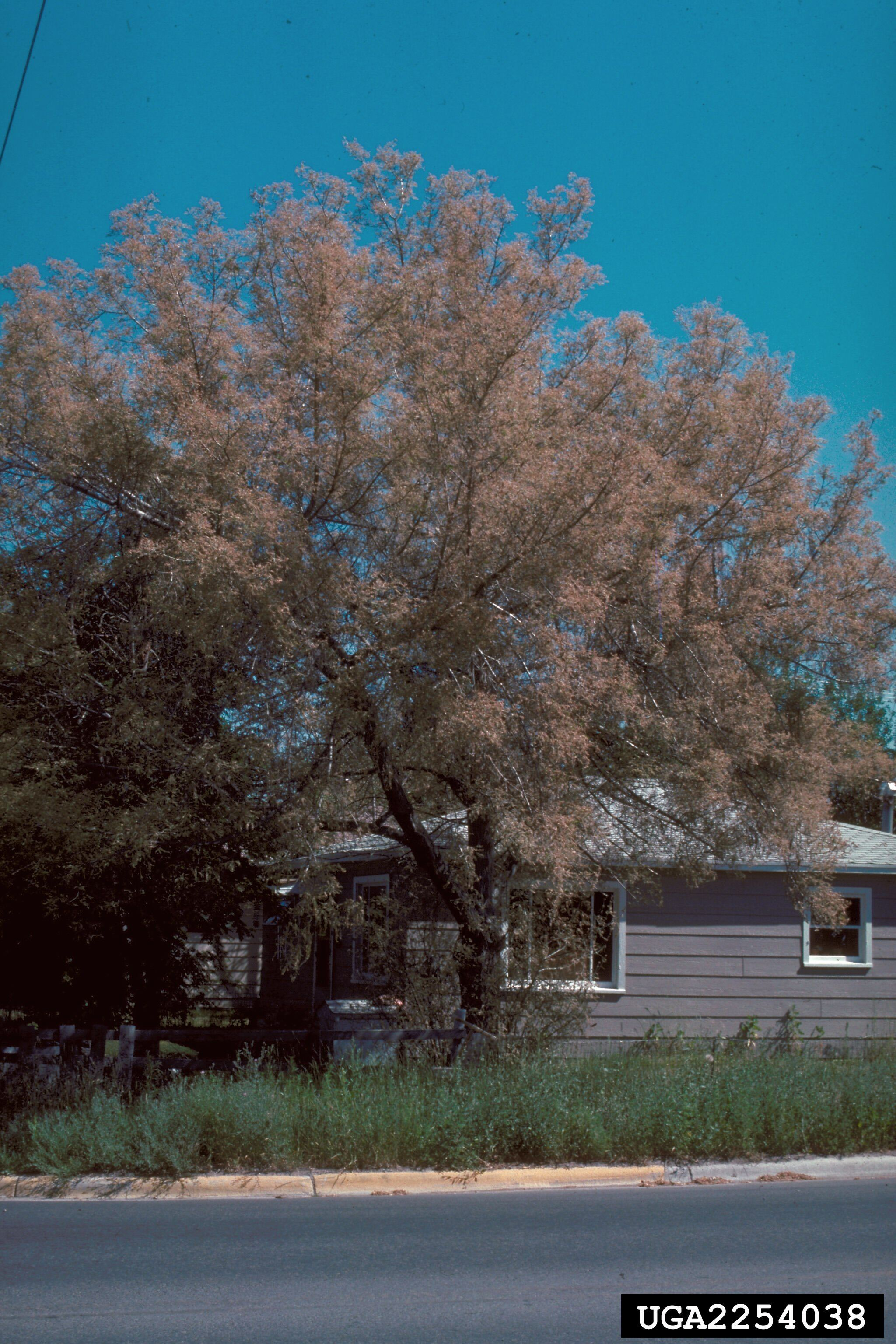
Damage

The wingspan is 18–21 mm. Adults are on wing in July.

The larvae feed on Acer negundo, nettle Urtica, and honeysuckle Lonicera.
