= Archips fuscocupreanus =

Scientific classification
- Kingdom: Animalia
- Phylum: Arthropoda
- Clade: Pancrustacea
- Class: Insecta
- Order: Lepidoptera
- Family: Tortricidae
- Genus: Archips
- Species: A. fuscocupreanus

Binomial name
- Archips fuscocupreanus Walsingham, 1900

Synonyms
- Loxotaenia ischidaii Razowski & Kumata, 1985; Loxotaenia ishidaii Matsumura, 1900; Cacoecia punicae Matsumura, 1931; Archips rosaceana Ishikawa, 1915

Species of moth

Archips fuscocupreanus, the exotic leafroller moth or apple tortrix, is a species of moth of the family Tortricidae. It is found in China (Heilongjiang, Liaoning), South Korea, Japan and Russia (Primorye, Kuril Islands). It is an introduced species in the north-eastern United States, where it has been recorded from Connecticut, Massachusetts, New Jersey, New York and Rhode Island. It has also been recorded from Washington.

The wingspan is 16–22 mm for males and 20–24 mm for females. Adults have been recorded on wing from June to July in China.

The larvae feed on Acer, Alnus, Betula, Castanea, Diospyros, Erigeron, Fragaria, Glycine, Juglans, Malus, Morus, Phaseolus, Prunus, Pyrus, Quercus, Rosa, Rubus, Salix, Sorbus and Ulmus species.
