= Archips insulanus =

Scientific classification
- Kingdom: Animalia
- Phylum: Arthropoda
- Clade: Pancrustacea
- Class: Insecta
- Order: Lepidoptera
- Family: Tortricidae
- Genus: Archips
- Species: A. insulanus

Binomial name
- Archips insulanus (Kawabe, 1965)

Synonyms
- Archippus insulanus Kawabe, 1965; Archips insulana

Species of moth

Archips insulanus is a species of moth of the family Tortricidae. It is found in Japan.

The wingspan is 13–16 mm for males and 17–21 mm for females.

The larvae feed on Arctium lappa.
