= Archips spinatus =

Scientific classification
- Kingdom: Animalia
- Phylum: Arthropoda
- Clade: Pancrustacea
- Class: Insecta
- Order: Lepidoptera
- Family: Tortricidae
- Genus: Archips
- Species: A. spinatus

Binomial name
- Archips spinatus Liu, 1987

Species of moth

Archips spinatus is a species of moth of the family Tortricidae. It is found in Liaoning, China.
