= Archips elongatus =

Scientific classification
- Kingdom: Animalia
- Phylum: Arthropoda
- Clade: Pancrustacea
- Class: Insecta
- Order: Lepidoptera
- Family: Tortricidae
- Genus: Archips
- Species: A. elongatus

Binomial name
- Archips elongatus Liu, 1987

Species of moth

Archips elongatus is a species of moth of the family Tortricidae. It is found in Shaanxi, China.

The length of the forewings is about 8 mm.
