= Archips peratratus =

Scientific classification
- Kingdom: Animalia
- Phylum: Arthropoda
- Clade: Pancrustacea
- Class: Insecta
- Order: Lepidoptera
- Family: Tortricidae
- Genus: Archips
- Species: A. peratratus

Binomial name
- Archips peratratus Yasuda, 1961

Species of moth

Archips peratratus is a species of moth of the family Tortricidae. It is found in Japan.

The wingspan is 19–25 mm for males and 23–28 mm for females.

The larvae feed on Ardisia sieboldii, Camellia japonica, Clerodendrum trichotomum, Daphniphyllum teysmannii, Lithocarpus edulis, Myrsine seguinii, Rhaphiolepis umbellata and Dioscorea species.
