= Archips socotranus =

Scientific classification
- Kingdom: Animalia
- Phylum: Arthropoda
- Clade: Pancrustacea
- Class: Insecta
- Order: Lepidoptera
- Family: Tortricidae
- Genus: Archips
- Species: A. socotranus

Binomial name
- Archips socotranus Walsingham, 1900

Synonyms
- Cryptophlebia socotrensis Brown, 2005

Species of moth

Archips socotranus is a species of moth of the family Tortricidae. It is found in Socotra, Yemen.
