= Archips termias =

Scientific classification
- Kingdom: Animalia
- Phylum: Arthropoda
- Clade: Pancrustacea
- Class: Insecta
- Order: Lepidoptera
- Family: Tortricidae
- Genus: Archips
- Species: A. termias

Binomial name
- Archips termias (Meyrick, 1918)

Synonyms
- Cacoecia termias Meyrick, 1918; Archips termias argutus Diakonoff, 1976; Cacoecia pomivora Meyrick, 1920; Cacoecia sarcostega Meyrick, 1924; Homona termias stenoptycha Diakonoff, 1951; Archips terminas Diakonoff, 1971

Species of moth

Archips termias, the apple leafroller, is a moth of the family Tortricidae. It is found in Vietnam, India, Nepal and China.

Larvae have been recorded feeding on Acacia nilotica, Citrus, Rosa, Coffea liberica, Malus pumila, Malus sylvestris and Prunus persica. They roll the leaves of their host plant.
