= Archips breviplicanus =

Scientific classification
- Kingdom: Animalia
- Phylum: Arthropoda
- Clade: Pancrustacea
- Class: Insecta
- Order: Lepidoptera
- Family: Tortricidae
- Genus: Archips
- Species: A. breviplicanus

Binomial name
- Archips breviplicanus Walsingham, 1900

Synonyms
- Cacoecia criticana Kennel, 1901; Archips breviplicana

Species of moth

Archips breviplicanus, the Asiatic leafroller, is a species of moth of the family Tortricidae. It is found in Japan, South Korea, China (Heilongjiang, Jilin) and Russia (Ussuri, Amur).

The moth is 16–24 mm for males and 23–28 mm for females. There are two to three generations per year with adults on wing in June and August.

The larvae feed on Malus (including Malus pumila), Pyrus, Alnus and Morus species, as well as Glycine max. They roll the leaves of their host plant. The species overwinters in the larval stage.
