= Archips eupatris =

Scientific classification
- Kingdom: Animalia
- Phylum: Arthropoda
- Clade: Pancrustacea
- Class: Insecta
- Order: Lepidoptera
- Family: Tortricidae
- Genus: Archips
- Species: A. eupatris

Binomial name
- Archips eupatris (Meyrick, 1908)

Synonyms
- Cacoecia eupatris Meyrick, 1908; Archips eupatris Clarke, 1958

Species of moth

Archips eupatris is a species of moth of the family Tortricidae first described by Edward Meyrick in 1908. It is found in Sri Lanka.
