= Archips dispilanus =

Scientific classification
- Kingdom: Animalia
- Phylum: Arthropoda
- Clade: Pancrustacea
- Class: Insecta
- Order: Lepidoptera
- Family: Tortricidae
- Genus: Archips
- Species: A. dispilanus

Binomial name
- Archips dispilanus (Walker, 1864)

Synonyms
- Pandemis dispilana Walker, 1864; Archips dispilana

Species of moth

Archips dispilanus is a species of moth of the family Tortricidae. It is found in Bhutan, India and Malaysia.

The larvae feed on Lonicera species, Nephelium lappaceum and Gardenia jasminoides.
