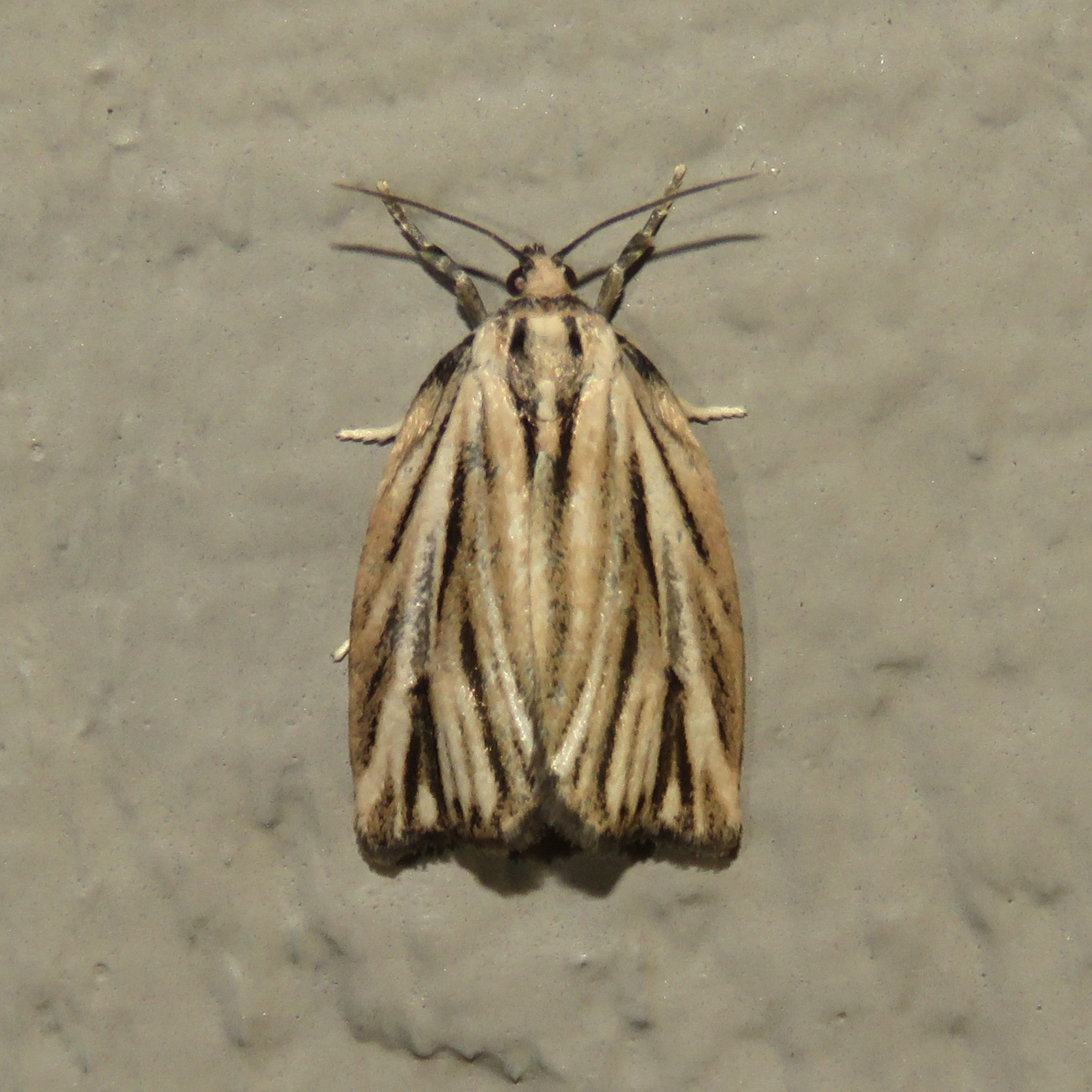

Scientific classification
- Kingdom: Animalia
- Phylum: Arthropoda
- Clade: Pancrustacea
- Class: Insecta
- Order: Lepidoptera
- Family: Tortricidae
- Genus: Archips
- Species: A. strianus

Binomial name
- Archips strianus Fernald, 1905

= Archips strianus =

Species of moth

Archips strianus, the striated tortrix moth or striated leafroller, is a species of moth of the family Tortricidae. It is found in North America, where it has been recorded from Alberta, British Columbia, Maine, Michigan, Minnesota, Montana, New Brunswick, Newfoundland, Ontario and Quebec.

The wingspan is about 20 mm. Adults have been recorded on wing from May to August.

Abies balsamea, Pinus engelmannii and Picea species (including Picea glauca, Picea mariana, Picea pungens and Picea sitchensis).
