= Archips solidus =

Scientific classification
- Kingdom: Animalia
- Phylum: Arthropoda
- Clade: Pancrustacea
- Class: Insecta
- Order: Lepidoptera
- Family: Tortricidae
- Genus: Archips
- Species: A. solidus

Binomial name
- Archips solidus (Meyrick, 1908)

Synonyms
- Cacoecia solida Meyrick, 1908; Archips solida

Species of moth

Archips solidus is a species of moth of the family Tortricidae. It is found in India (Darjeeling in West Bengal) and Malaysia.

The larvae feed on Annona muricata and Cedrela toona.
