= Snodgrassia =

Scientific classification
- Kingdom: Animalia
- Phylum: Arthropoda
- Class: Insecta
- Order: Lepidoptera
- Family: Tortricidae
- Subfamily: Tortricinae
- Tribe: Archipini
- Genus: Snodgrassia; Diakonoff, 1968

Genus of moths

Snodgrassia is a genus of moths belonging to the subfamily Tortricinae of the family Tortricidae.

== Species ==
- Snodgrassia buruana (Diakonoff, 1941)
- Snodgrassia calliplecta Diakonoff, 1983
- Snodgrassia petrophracta (Meyrick, 1938)
- Snodgrassia stenochorda (Meyrick, 1928)

== Etymology ==
The genus is named for insect morphologist Dr. Robert Evans Snodgrass.
