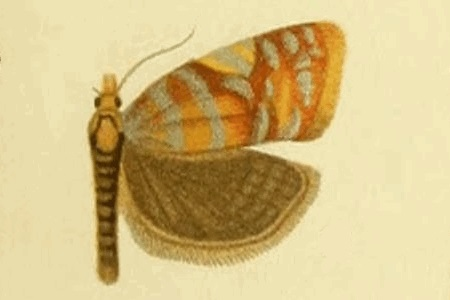
- Abrepagoge treitschkean

Scientific classification
- Kingdom: Animalia
- Phylum: Arthropoda
- Class: Insecta
- Order: Lepidoptera
- Family: Tortricidae
- Tribe: Archipini
- Genus: Geogepa; Razowski, 1977

= Geogepa =

Genus of tortrix moths

Geogepa is a genus of moths belonging to the subfamily Tortricinae of the family Tortricidae.

== Species ==
- Geogepa malacotorna (Meyrick, 1931)
- Geogepa monticola Jinbo, 2004
- Geogepa nigropunctata Kawabe, 1985
- Geogepa pedaliota (Meyrick, 1936)
- Geogepa promiscua Razowski, 1977
- Geogepa stenochorda (Diakonoff, 1948)
- Geogepa striatula Razowski, 2008
- Geogepa zeuxidia Razowski, 1977

== See also ==
- List of Tortricidae genera
