= Balioxena =

Scientific classification
- Kingdom: Animalia
- Phylum: Arthropoda
- Class: Insecta
- Order: Lepidoptera
- Family: Tortricidae
- Tribe: Archipini
- Genus: Balioxena; Meyrick, 1912

Genus of tortrix moths

Balioxena is a genus of moths belonging to the subfamily Tortricinae in the family Tortricidae. The genus was erected by Edward Meyrick.

== Species ==
- Balioxena iospila Meyrick, 1912

== See also ==
- List of Tortricidae genera
