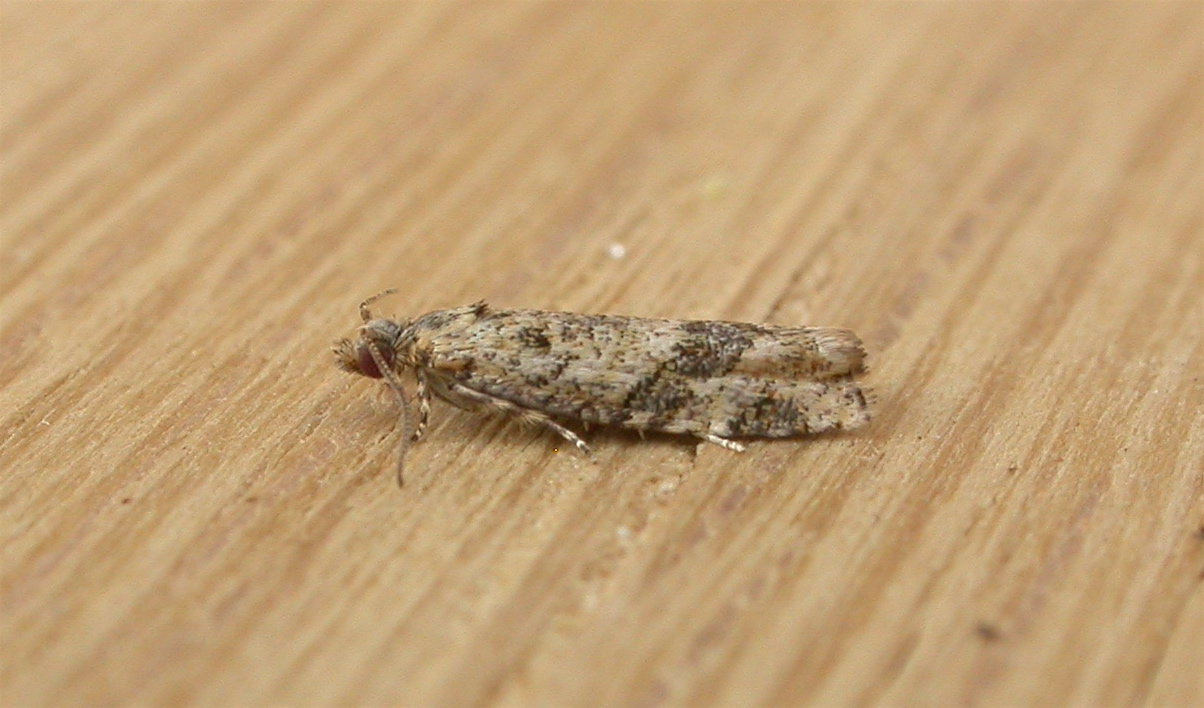
- Isochorista ranulana

Scientific classification
- Kingdom: Animalia
- Phylum: Arthropoda
- Class: Insecta
- Order: Lepidoptera
- Family: Tortricidae
- Tribe: Archipini
- Genus: Isochorista; Meyrick, 1881

= Isochorista =

Genus of tortrix moths

Isochorista is a genus of moths belonging to the subfamily Tortricinae of the family Tortricidae.

== Species ==
- Isochorista acrodesma (Lower, 1902)
- Isochorista chaodes Meyrick, 1910
- Isochorista encotodes Meyrick, 1910
- Isochorista helota Meyrick, 1910
- Isochorista melanocrypta Meyrick, 1910
- Isochorista panaeolana Meyrick, 1881
- Isochorista parmiferana (Meyrick, 1881)
- Isochorista pumicosa Meyrick, 1910
- Isochorista ranulana Meyrick, 1881
- Isochorista sulcata Diakonoff, 1952

== See also ==
- List of Tortricidae genera
