= Cornuticlava =

Scientific classification
- Domain: Eukaryota
- Kingdom: Animalia
- Phylum: Arthropoda
- Class: Insecta
- Order: Lepidoptera
- Family: Tortricidae
- Tribe: Schoenotenini
- Genus: Cornuticlava; Diakonoff, 1960

Genus of moths

Cornuticlava is a genus of moths belonging to the subfamily Tortricinae of the family Tortricidae.

== Species ==
- Cornuticlava aritrana Common, 1965
- Cornuticlava beccarii (Diakonoff, 1960)
- Cornuticlava binaiae Razowski, 2013
- Cornuticlava chrysoconis (Diakonoff, 1954)
- Cornuticlava cuspidata (Diakonoff, 1954)
- Cornuticlava heijningeni Diakonoff, 1972
- Cornuticlava kobipoto Razowski, 2013
- Cornuticlava phanera Common, 1965
- Cornuticlava saliaris (Meyrick, 1928)
- Cornuticlava spectralis (Meyrick, 1912)

== See also ==
- List of Tortricidae genera
