= Nuritamburia =

Scientific classification
- Domain: Eukaryota
- Kingdom: Animalia
- Phylum: Arthropoda
- Class: Insecta
- Order: Lepidoptera
- Family: Tortricidae
- Tribe: Archipini
- Genus: Nuritamburia; Koçak & Kemal, 2007

Synonyms
- Bradleyella Zimmerman, 1978

Genus of tortrix moths

Nuritamburia is a genus of moths belonging to the subfamily Tortricinae of the family Tortricidae.

== Species ==
- Nuritamburia chlorocalla (Walsingham, in Sharp, 1907)
- Nuritamburia metallurgica (Walsingham, in Sharp, 1907)
- Nuritamburia phyllanthana (Swezey, 1940)
- Nuritamburia semicineriana (Swezey, 1913)
- Nuritamburia thoracina (Walsingham, 1907)

== Taxonomy ==
Nuritamburia is the replacement name for Bradleyella.

== See also ==
- List of Tortricidae genera
