= Terricula =

Scientific classification
- Kingdom: Animalia
- Phylum: Arthropoda
- Clade: Pancrustacea
- Class: Insecta
- Order: Lepidoptera
- Family: Tortricidae
- Tribe: Archipini
- Genus: Terricula; Falkovitsh, 1965

Genus of tortrix moths

Terricula is a genus of moths belonging to the subfamily Tortricinae of the family Tortricidae.

== Species ==
- Terricula bifurcata Wang & Li, 2004
- Terricula cnephaeana Razowski, 2008
- Terricula graphitana Razowski, 2009
- Terricula major Razowski, 2008
- Terricula minor Razowski, 2008
- Terricula violetana (Kawabe, 1964)

== See also ==
- List of Tortricidae genera
