= Cuspidata =

Scientific classification
- Domain: Eukaryota
- Kingdom: Animalia
- Phylum: Arthropoda
- Class: Insecta
- Order: Lepidoptera
- Family: Tortricidae
- Tribe: Archipini
- Genus: Cuspidata; Diakonoff, 1960

Synonyms
- Pilophorica Diakonoff, 1960

Genus of moths

Cuspidata is a genus of moths belonging to the subfamily Tortricinae of the family Tortricidae.

== Species ==
- Cuspidata anthracitis Diakonoff, 1960
- Cuspidata bidens Diakonoff, 1960
- Cuspidata castanea Diakonoff, 1960
- Cuspidata ditoma Diakonoff, 1960
- Cuspidata hypomelas Diakonoff, 1960
- Cuspidata leptozona Diakonoff, 1960
- Cuspidata micaria Diakonoff, 1973
- Cuspidata obscura Diakonoff, 1970
- Cuspidata oligosperma Diakonoff, 1960
- Cuspidata viettei Diakonoff, 1960

== See also ==
- List of Tortricidae genera
