= Metachorista =

Scientific classification
- Kingdom: Animalia
- Phylum: Arthropoda
- Class: Insecta
- Order: Lepidoptera
- Family: Tortricidae
- Tribe: Schoenotenini
- Genus: Metachorista; Meyrick, 1938

Genus of moths

Metachorista is a genus of moths belonging to the subfamily Tortricinae of the family Tortricidae.

== Species ==
- Metachorista austera Diakonoff, 1954
- Metachorista caliginosa Diakonoff, 1973
- Metachorista deltophora Diakonoff, 1954
- Metachorista evidens Diakonoff, 1973
- Metachorista loepa Diakonoff, 1954
- Metachorista longiseta Razowski, 2013
- Metachorista megalophrys Diakonoff, 1954
- Metachorista mesata Diakonoff, 1954
- Metachorista refracta Diakonoff, 1954
- Metachorista spermatodesma Diakonoff, 1974
- Metachorista tineoides Diakonoff, 1954
- Metachorista ursula Meyrick, 1938

== See also ==
- List of Tortricidae genera
