= Labidosa =

Scientific classification
- Domain: Eukaryota
- Kingdom: Animalia
- Phylum: Arthropoda
- Class: Insecta
- Order: Lepidoptera
- Family: Tortricidae
- Tribe: Archipini
- Genus: Labidosa; Diakonoff, 1960

Genus of tortrix moths

Labidosa is a genus of moths belonging to the subfamily Tortricinae of the family Tortricidae.

== Species ==
- Labidosa ochrostoma (Meyrick, 1918)
- Labidosa sogai Diakonoff, 1960

== See also ==
- List of Tortricidae genera
