= Diplocalyptis =

Scientific classification
- Kingdom: Animalia
- Phylum: Arthropoda
- Class: Insecta
- Order: Lepidoptera
- Family: Tortricidae
- Tribe: Archipini
- Genus: Diplocalyptis; Diakonoff, 1976

Type species
- Diplocalyptis apona Diakonoff, 1976

Species
- 8 species (see text)

Genus of tortrix moths

Diplocalyptis is a genus of moths belonging to the subfamily Tortricinae of the family Tortricidae. They occur in South and East Asia.

== Species ==
There are eight species:

- Diplocalyptis apona Diakonoff, 1976
- Diplocalyptis congruentana (Kennel, 1901)
- Diplocalyptis ferruginimixta Razowski, 2009
- Diplocalyptis nigricana (Yasuda, 1975)
- Diplocalyptis operosa (Meyrick, 1908)
- Diplocalyptis shanpingana Razowski, 2000
- Diplocalyptis tennuicula Razowski, 1984
- Diplocalyptis triangulifera Razowski, 2009

== See also ==
- List of Tortricidae genera
