= Prothelymna =

Scientific classification
- Kingdom: Animalia
- Phylum: Arthropoda
- Class: Insecta
- Order: Lepidoptera
- Family: Tortricidae
- Tribe: Schoenotenini
- Genus: Prothelymna; Meyrick, 1883

Genus of moths

Prothelymna is a genus of moths belonging to the subfamily Tortricinae of the family Tortricidae.

== Species ==
- Prothelymna antiquana (Walker, 1863)
- Prothelymna niphostrota Meyrick, 1907

== See also ==
- List of Tortricidae genera
