= Gelophaula =

Scientific classification
- Kingdom: Animalia
- Phylum: Arthropoda
- Class: Insecta
- Order: Lepidoptera
- Family: Tortricidae
- Tribe: Archipini
- Genus: Gelophaula; Meyrick, 1923

Genus of tortrix moths

Gelophaula is a genus of moths belonging to the subfamily Tortricinae of the family Tortricidae.

== Species ==
- Gelophaula aenea (Butler, 1877)
- Gelophaula aridella Clarke, 1934
- Gelophaula lychnophanes (Meyrick, 1916)
- Gelophaula palliata (Philpott, 1914)
- Gelophaula praecipitalis Meyrick, 1934
- Gelophaula siraea (Meyrick, 1885)
- Gelophaula tributaria (Philpott, 1913)
- Gelophaula trisulca (Meyrick, 1916)
- Gelophaula vana Philpott, 1928

== See also ==
- List of Tortricidae genera
