= Schoenotenes =

Scientific classification
- Domain: Eukaryota
- Kingdom: Animalia
- Phylum: Arthropoda
- Class: Insecta
- Order: Lepidoptera
- Family: Tortricidae
- Tribe: Schoenotenini
- Genus: Schoenotenes; Meyrick, 1908

Genus of moths

Schoenotenes is a genus of moths belonging to the subfamily Tortricinae of the family Tortricidae.

== Species ==
- Schoenotenes affinis Diakonoff, 1954
- Schoenotenes agana Diakonoff, 1954
- Schoenotenes aphrodes Diakonoff, 1954
- Schoenotenes argentaura Diakonoff, 1960
- Schoenotenes aurispersa Diakonoff, 1954
- Schoenotenes capnosema Turner, 1918
- Schoenotenes centroicta Diakonoff, 1960
- Schoenotenes chalcitis Diakonoff, 1954
- Schoenotenes coccyx Diakonoff, 1954
- Schoenotenes collarigera Diakonoff, 1968
- Schoenotenes croceosema Diakonoff, 1954
- Schoenotenes decta Diakonoff, 1974
- Schoenotenes elasma Razowski, 2013
- Schoenotenes emmetra Razowski, 2013
- Schoenotenes gliscens Diakonoff, 1960
- Schoenotenes iners Diakonoff, 1960
- Schoenotenes lichenochroma Diakonoff, 1954
- Schoenotenes luminosa Diakonoff, 1960
- Schoenotenes nanodes Diakonoff, 1954
- Schoenotenes oenographa Diakonoff, 1954
- Schoenotenes oligosema Diakonoff, 1954
- Schoenotenes ovalis Diakonoff, 1973
- Schoenotenes pallida Diakonoff, 1954
- Schoenotenes peos Razowski, 2013
- Schoenotenes peralba Diakonoff, 1960
- Schoenotenes petraea Diakonoff, 1954
- Schoenotenes plagiostibus Diakonoff, 1954
- Schoenotenes prophanes Diakonoff, 1954
- Schoenotenes pseudurga Diakonoff, 1960
- Schoenotenes sciocosma Meyrick, 1938
- Schoenotenes spilonoma Meyrick, 1938
- Schoenotenes sufflava Diakonoff, 1954
- Schoenotenes synchorda Meyrick, 1908
- Schoenotenes trachygrapha Diakonoff, 1954
- Schoenotenes vana Diakonoff, 1954

== See also ==
- List of Tortricidae genera
