= Diactenis =

Scientific classification
- Kingdom: Animalia
- Phylum: Arthropoda
- Class: Insecta
- Order: Lepidoptera
- Family: Tortricidae
- Tribe: Schoenotenini
- Genus: Diactenis; Meyrick, 1907

Genus of moths

Diactenis is a genus of moths belonging to the subfamily Tortricinae of the family Tortricidae.

== Species ==
- Diactenis barbarae Diakonoff, 1957
- Diactenis bidentifera Meyrick, 1928
- Diactenis deformata Meyrick, 1928
- Diactenis isotima Diakonoff, 1952
- Diactenis orthometalla (Meyrick, 1922)
- Diactenis plumula Diakonoff, 1952
- Diactenis pteroneura Meyrick, 1907
- Diactenis sequax Diakonoff, 1952
- Diactenis thauma Diakonoff, 1952
- Diactenis tryphera Common, 1965
- Diactenis veligera Meyrick, 1928
- Diactenis youngi Razowski, 2000

== See also ==
- List of Tortricidae genera
