= Stenarchella =

Scientific classification
- Kingdom: Animalia
- Phylum: Arthropoda
- Class: Insecta
- Order: Lepidoptera
- Family: Tortricidae
- Tribe: Schoenotenini
- Genus: Stenarchella; Diakonoff, 1968

Genus of tortrix moths

Stenarchella is a genus of moths belonging to the subfamily Tortricinae of the family Tortricidae.

== Species ==
- Stenarchella eupista Diakonoff, 1968

== See also ==
- List of Tortricidae genera
