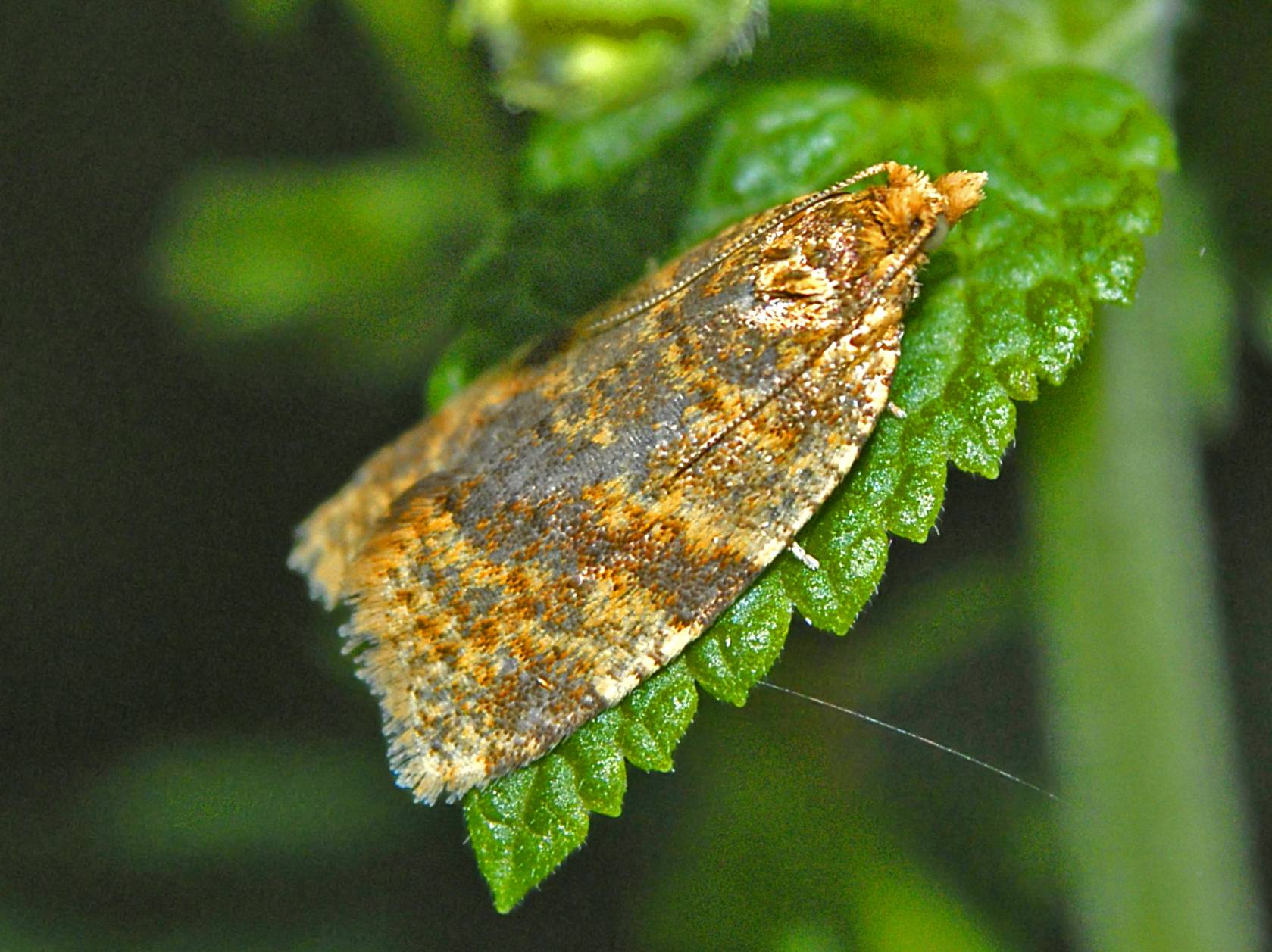
- Epagoge grotiana

Scientific classification
- Domain: Eukaryota
- Kingdom: Animalia
- Phylum: Arthropoda
- Class: Insecta
- Order: Lepidoptera
- Family: Tortricidae
- Subfamily: Tortricinae
- Genus: Epaggoge; Hübner, [1825]

Synonyms
- Epapoge Hübner, [1825] 1816

= Epagoge (moth) =

Genus of tortrix moths

Epagoge is a genus of moths belonging to the subfamily Tortricinae of the family Tortricidae. The genus was erected by Jacob Hübner in 1825.

== Species ==
- Epagoge conspersana Diakonoff, 1953
- Epagoge grotiana (Fabricius, 1781)
- Epagoge melanatma (Meyrick, 1908)
- Epagoge mellosa Diakonoff, 1951
- Epagoge metacentra (Meyrick, 1918)
- Epagoge occidentalis Diakonoff, 1948
- Epagoge vulgaris (Meyrick, 1921)
- Epagoge xanthomitra Diakonoff, 1941

== See also ==
- List of Tortricidae genera
