= Digitosa =

Scientific classification
- Domain: Eukaryota
- Kingdom: Animalia
- Phylum: Arthropoda
- Class: Insecta
- Order: Lepidoptera
- Family: Tortricidae
- Tribe: Archipini
- Genus: Digitosa; Diakonoff, 1960

Genus of tortrix moths

Digitosa is a genus of moths belonging to the subfamily Tortricinae of the family Tortricidae. It is found in Madagascar.

== Species ==
- Digitosa elliptica Diakonoff, 1960
- Digitosa gnesia Diakonoff, 1960
- Digitosa leptographa Diakonoff, 1960
- Digitosa metaxantha Diakonoff, 1960
- Digitosa stenographa Diakonoff, 1970
- Digitosa vulpina Diakonoff, 1960

== See also ==
- List of Tortricidae genera
