= Syllomatia pirastis =

Scientific classification
- Kingdom: Animalia
- Phylum: Arthropoda
- Class: Insecta
- Order: Lepidoptera
- Family: Tortricidae
- Genus: Syllomatia
- Species: S. pirastis

Binomial name
- Syllomatia pirastis (Meyrick, 1910)

Synonyms
- Arotrophora pirastis Meyrick, 1910; Arotrophora castanea Meyrick, 1910; Arotrophora pantoeodes Turner, 1939

Species of moth

Syllomatia pirastis is a species of moth of the family Tortricidae. It is found in Australia, where it has been recorded from South Australia and Tasmania. The habitat consists of open forests.

The wingspan is about 18 mm.

The larvae feed on Lomatia tinctoria.
