= Terricula minor =

Scientific classification
- Domain: Eukaryota
- Kingdom: Animalia
- Phylum: Arthropoda
- Class: Insecta
- Order: Lepidoptera
- Family: Tortricidae
- Genus: Terricula
- Species: T. minor

Binomial name
- Terricula minor Razowski, 2008

Species of moth

Terricula minor is a moth of the family Tortricidae. It is found in Vietnam.

The wingspan is 12 mm for males and 18 mm for females.
