= Alytopistis =

Scientific classification
- Kingdom: Animalia
- Phylum: Arthropoda
- Class: Insecta
- Order: Lepidoptera
- Family: Tortricidae
- Subfamily: Tortricinae
- Genus: Alytopistis; Meyrick, 1920

Genus of tortrix moths

Alytopistis is a genus of moths belonging to the subfamily Tortricinae of the family Tortricidae.

== Species ==
- Alytopistis tortricitella (Walker, 1866)

== See also ==
- List of Tortricidae genera
