= Gelophaula palliata =

Scientific classification
- Kingdom: Animalia
- Phylum: Arthropoda
- Class: Insecta
- Order: Lepidoptera
- Family: Tortricidae
- Genus: Gelophaula
- Species: G. palliata

Binomial name
- Gelophaula palliata (Philpott, 1914)

Synonyms
- Harmologa palliata Philpott, 1914

Species of moth

Gelophaula palliata is a species of moth of the family Tortricidae. It is native to in New Zealand.

The male wingspan ranges from 24mm (~0.95", or ^{15}/_{16} of an inch) to 27 mm (1"), and the female wingspan is approximately 29 mm (1.14"). Males have dark fuscous forewings with pale-yellow scales, tinged with blue near the costa and dorsum, and the hindwings are dark reddish fuscous. Females have pale-fuscous forewings, with light-yellow scales, which become bluish white towards the middle of the costa. Adults have been reported on wing from November to February.

Larvae have been recorded feeding on the rosettes of Celmisia prorepens.
