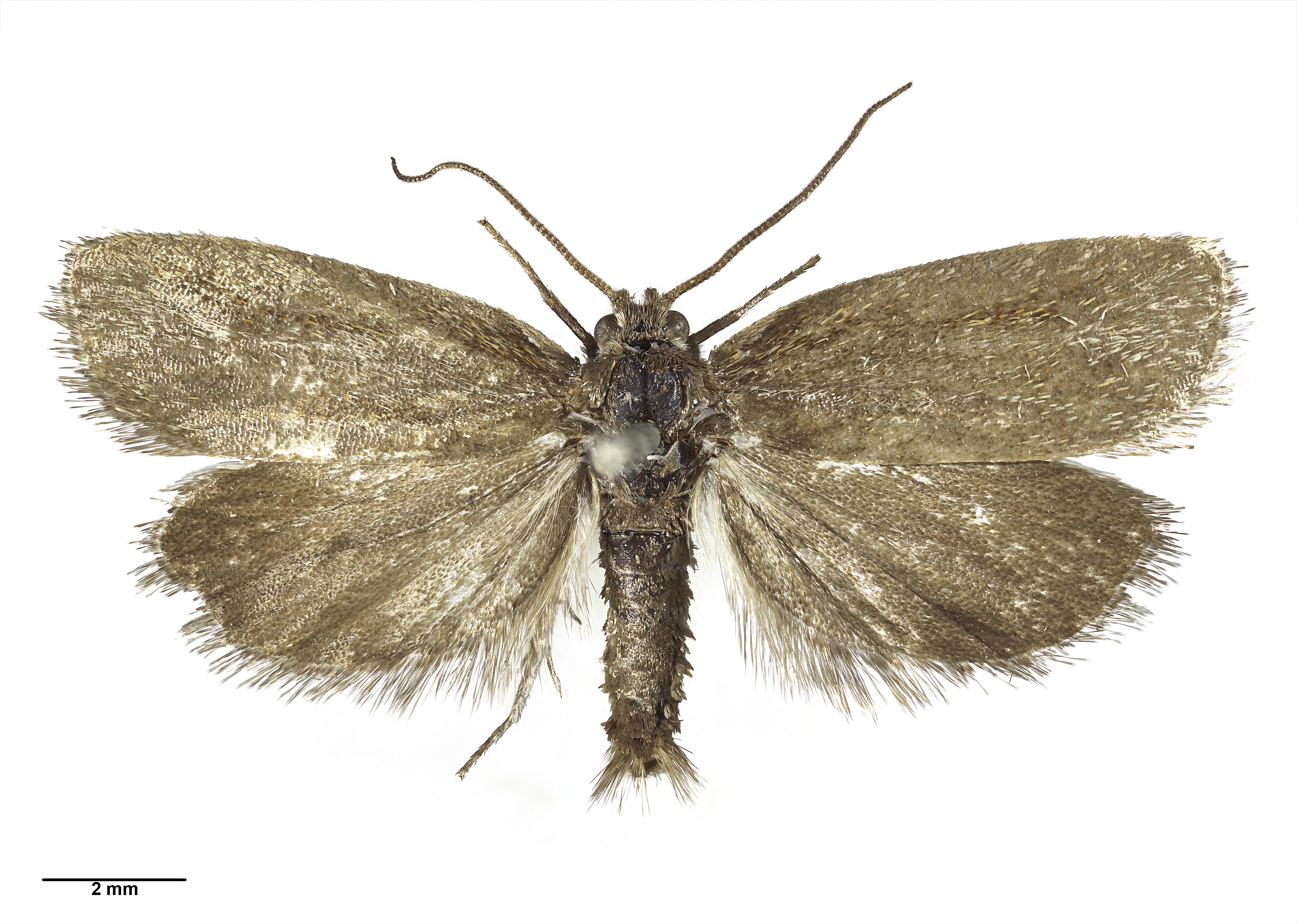

Scientific classification
- Kingdom: Animalia
- Phylum: Arthropoda
- Class: Insecta
- Order: Lepidoptera
- Family: Tortricidae
- Genus: Gelophaula
- Species: G. aridella

Binomial name
- Gelophaula aridella Clarke, 1934

Synonyms
- Teras aenea Butler, 1877

= Gelophaula aridella =

Species of moth

Gelophaula aridella is a species of moth of the family Tortricidae. It is found in New Zealand.

The wingspan is 15 mm. Adults have been reported on wing from December to January.
