= Ioditis capnobactra =

Scientific classification
- Kingdom: Animalia
- Phylum: Arthropoda
- Class: Insecta
- Order: Lepidoptera
- Family: Tortricidae
- Genus: Ioditis
- Species: I. capnobactra

Binomial name
- Ioditis capnobactra Meyrick, 1938

Species of moth

Ioditis capnobactra is a species of moth of the family Tortricidae. It is found in the Democratic Republic of Congo.
