= Ioditis mokwae =

Scientific classification
- Kingdom: Animalia
- Phylum: Arthropoda
- Clade: Pancrustacea
- Class: Insecta
- Order: Lepidoptera
- Family: Tortricidae
- Genus: Ioditis
- Species: I. mokwae

Binomial name
- Ioditis mokwae Razowski, 2013

Species of moth

Ioditis mokwae is a moth of the family Tortricidae. It is found in Nigeria.

The wingspan is about 18 mm.

== Etymology ==
The species name refers to Mokwa, the type locality.
