= Terricula violetana =

Scientific classification
- Kingdom: Animalia
- Phylum: Arthropoda
- Class: Insecta
- Order: Lepidoptera
- Family: Tortricidae
- Genus: Terricula
- Species: T. violetana

Binomial name
- Terricula violetana (Kawabe, 1964)

Synonyms
- Philedone violetana Kawabe, 1964; Terricula noctis Falkovitsh, 1965

Species of moth

Terricula violetana is a species of moth of the family Tortricidae. It is found in Japan (Honshu).

The wingspan is 14–21 mm.
