= Geogepa promiscua =

Scientific classification
- Kingdom: Animalia
- Phylum: Arthropoda
- Class: Insecta
- Order: Lepidoptera
- Family: Tortricidae
- Genus: Geogepa
- Species: G. promiscua

Binomial name
- Geogepa promiscua Razowski, 1977

Species of moth

Geogepa promiscua is a species of moth of the family Tortricidae. It is found in Taiwan.
