= Geogepa pedaliota =

Scientific classification
- Kingdom: Animalia
- Phylum: Arthropoda
- Class: Insecta
- Order: Lepidoptera
- Family: Tortricidae
- Genus: Geogepa
- Species: G. pedaliota

Binomial name
- Geogepa pedaliota (Meyrick, 1936)

Synonyms
- Capua pedaliota Meyrick, 1936

Species of moth

Geogepa pedaliota is a moth of the family Tortricidae. It is found in Taiwan.
