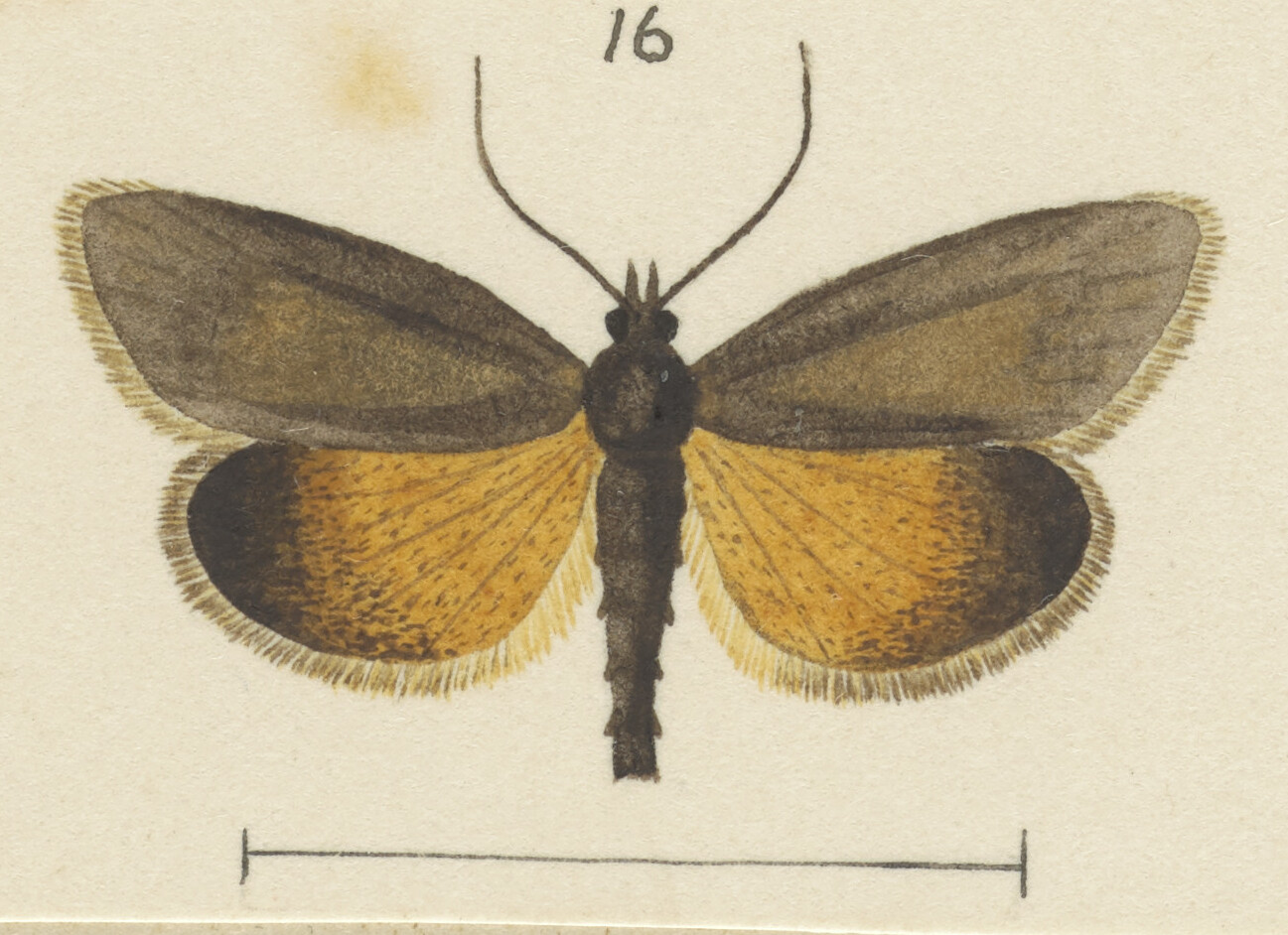
- Illustration of male

Scientific classification
- Kingdom: Animalia
- Phylum: Arthropoda
- Class: Insecta
- Order: Lepidoptera
- Family: Tortricidae
- Genus: Gelophaula
- Species: G. praecipitalis

Binomial name
- Gelophaula praecipitalis Meyrick, 1934

= Gelophaula praecipitalis =

Species of moth

Gelophaula praecipitalis is a species of moth of the family Tortricidae. It is found in New Zealand.

The larvae have been recorded feeding on Celmisia lyallii.
