= Digitosa vulpina =

Scientific classification
- Domain: Eukaryota
- Kingdom: Animalia
- Phylum: Arthropoda
- Class: Insecta
- Order: Lepidoptera
- Family: Tortricidae
- Genus: Digitosa
- Species: D. vulpina

Binomial name
- Digitosa vulpina Diakonoff, 1960

Species of moth

Digitosa vulpina is a species of moth of the family Tortricidae. It is found in Madagascar.
