= Snodgrassia petrophracta =

Scientific classification
- Kingdom: Animalia
- Phylum: Arthropoda
- Class: Insecta
- Order: Lepidoptera
- Family: Tortricidae
- Genus: Snodgrassia
- Species: S. petrophracta

Binomial name
- Snodgrassia petrophracta (Meyrick, 1938)

Synonyms
- Tortrix petrophracta Meyrick, 1938

Species of moth

Snodgrassia petrophracta is a species of moth of the family Tortricidae. It is found in Papua New Guinea.
