= Symphygas =

Scientific classification
- Domain: Eukaryota
- Kingdom: Animalia
- Phylum: Arthropoda
- Class: Insecta
- Order: Lepidoptera
- Family: Tortricidae
- Subfamily: Tortricinae
- Genus: Symphygas; Common, 1963
- Species: S. nephaula

Binomial name
- Symphygas nephaula (Meyrick, 1910)

Synonyms
- Tortrix nephaula Meyrick, 1910

Monotypic genus of tortrix moths

Symphygas is a genus of moths belonging to the subfamily Tortricinae of the family Tortricidae. It contains only one species, Symphygas nephaula, which is found in Australia, where it has been recorded from Tasmania. The habitat consists of subalpine open forests at altitudes between 950 and 1,100 meters.

The wingspan is about 13.5 mm for males and 14.5 mm for females.

== See also ==
- List of Tortricidae genera
