= Isochorista chaodes =

Scientific classification
- Kingdom: Animalia
- Phylum: Arthropoda
- Class: Insecta
- Order: Lepidoptera
- Family: Tortricidae
- Genus: Isochorista
- Species: I. chaodes

Binomial name
- Isochorista chaodes Meyrick, 1910

Species of moth

Isochorista chaodes is a species of moth of the family Tortricidae. It is found in Australia, where it has been recorded from Tasmania and the Australian Capital Territory. The habitat consists of tall wet eucalypt forests and open forests.

The wingspan is about 13 mm.

The larvae feed on Eucalyptus species, skeletonising the undersides of the dead leaves.
