= Labidosa ochrostoma =

Scientific classification
- Domain: Eukaryota
- Kingdom: Animalia
- Phylum: Arthropoda
- Class: Insecta
- Order: Lepidoptera
- Family: Tortricidae
- Genus: Labidosa
- Species: L. ochrostoma

Binomial name
- Labidosa ochrostoma (Meyrick, 1918)

Synonyms
- Cacoecia ochrostoma Meyrick, 1918

Species of moth

Labidosa ochrostoma is a species of moth of the family Tortricidae. It is found in the Central African Republic and the Democratic Republic of Congo.
