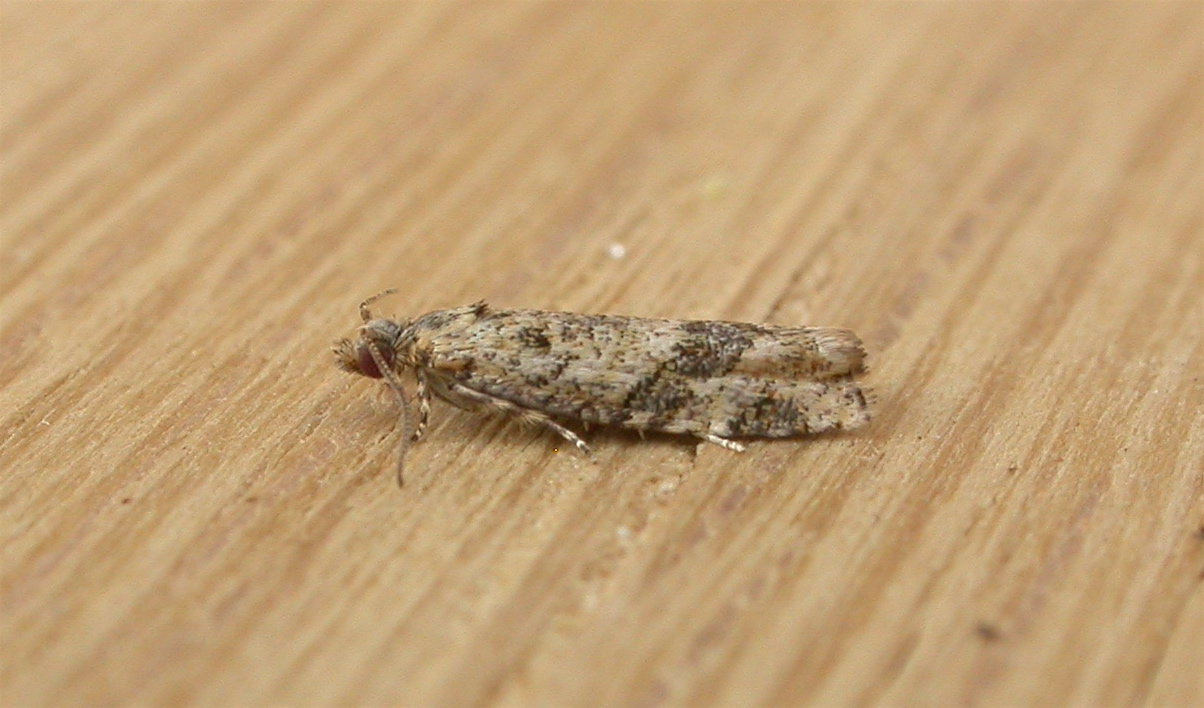

Scientific classification
- Domain: Eukaryota
- Kingdom: Animalia
- Phylum: Arthropoda
- Class: Insecta
- Order: Lepidoptera
- Family: Tortricidae
- Genus: Isochorista
- Species: I. ranulana

Binomial name
- Isochorista ranulana Meyrick, 1881

= Isochorista ranulana =

Species of moth

Isochorista ranulana is a species of moth of the family Tortricidae. It is found in Australia, where it has been recorded from New South Wales and the Australian Capital Territory.

The wingspan is about 10 mm. The wings are grey with a dark diagonal band across the forewings.
