= Isochorista panaeolana =

Scientific classification
- Kingdom: Animalia
- Phylum: Arthropoda
- Class: Insecta
- Order: Lepidoptera
- Family: Tortricidae
- Genus: Isochorista
- Species: I. panaeolana

Binomial name
- Isochorista panaeolana Meyrick, 1881

Species of moth

Isochorista panaeolana is a species of moth of the family Tortricidae. It is found in Australia, where it has been recorded from New South Wales, the Australian Capital Territory and Tasmania. The habitat consists of wet eucalypt forests and open dry eucalypt forests.

The wingspan is about 11 mm.

The larvae feed on Eucalyptus species, joining dead leaves on the ground.
