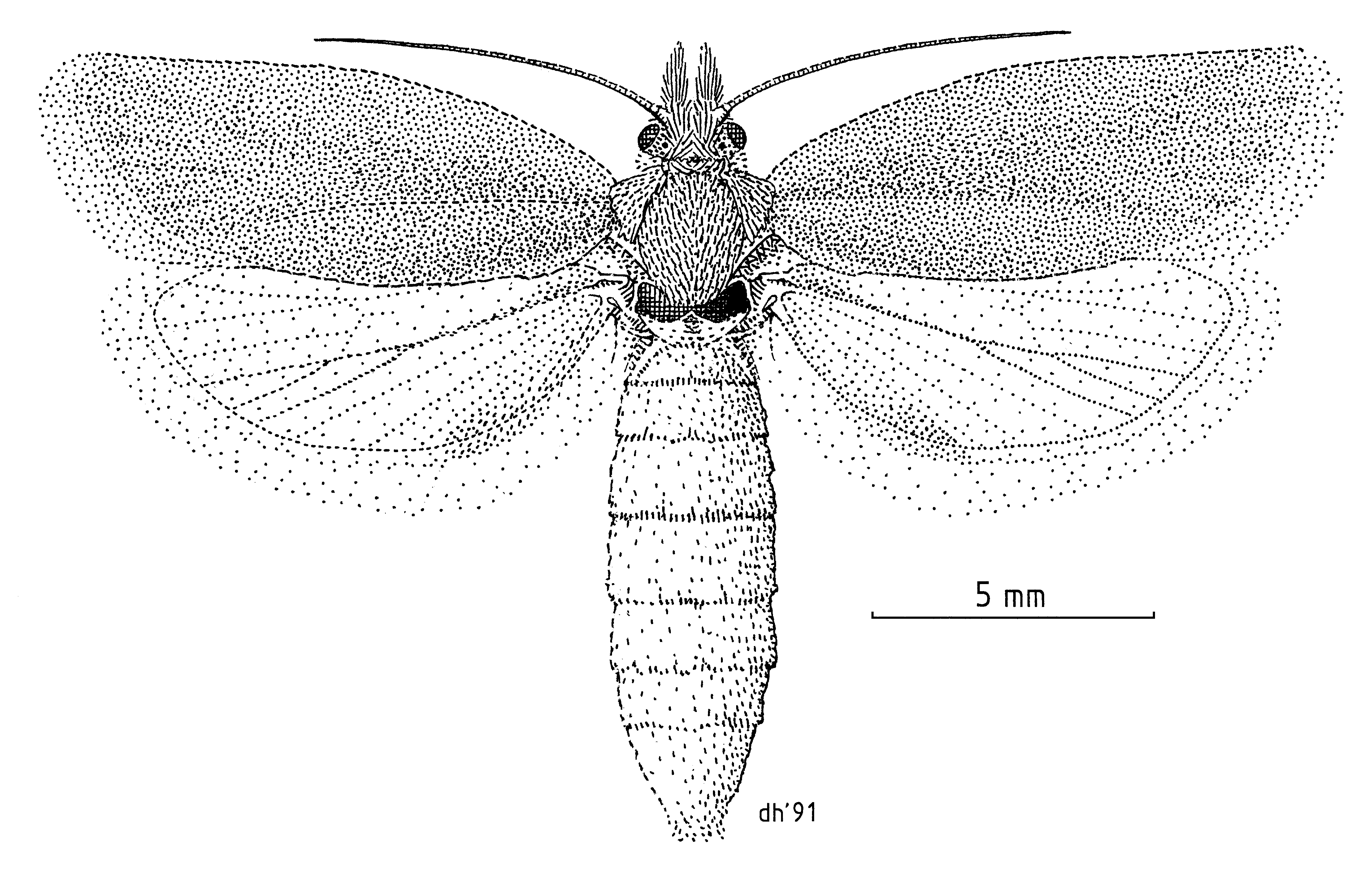
- Female
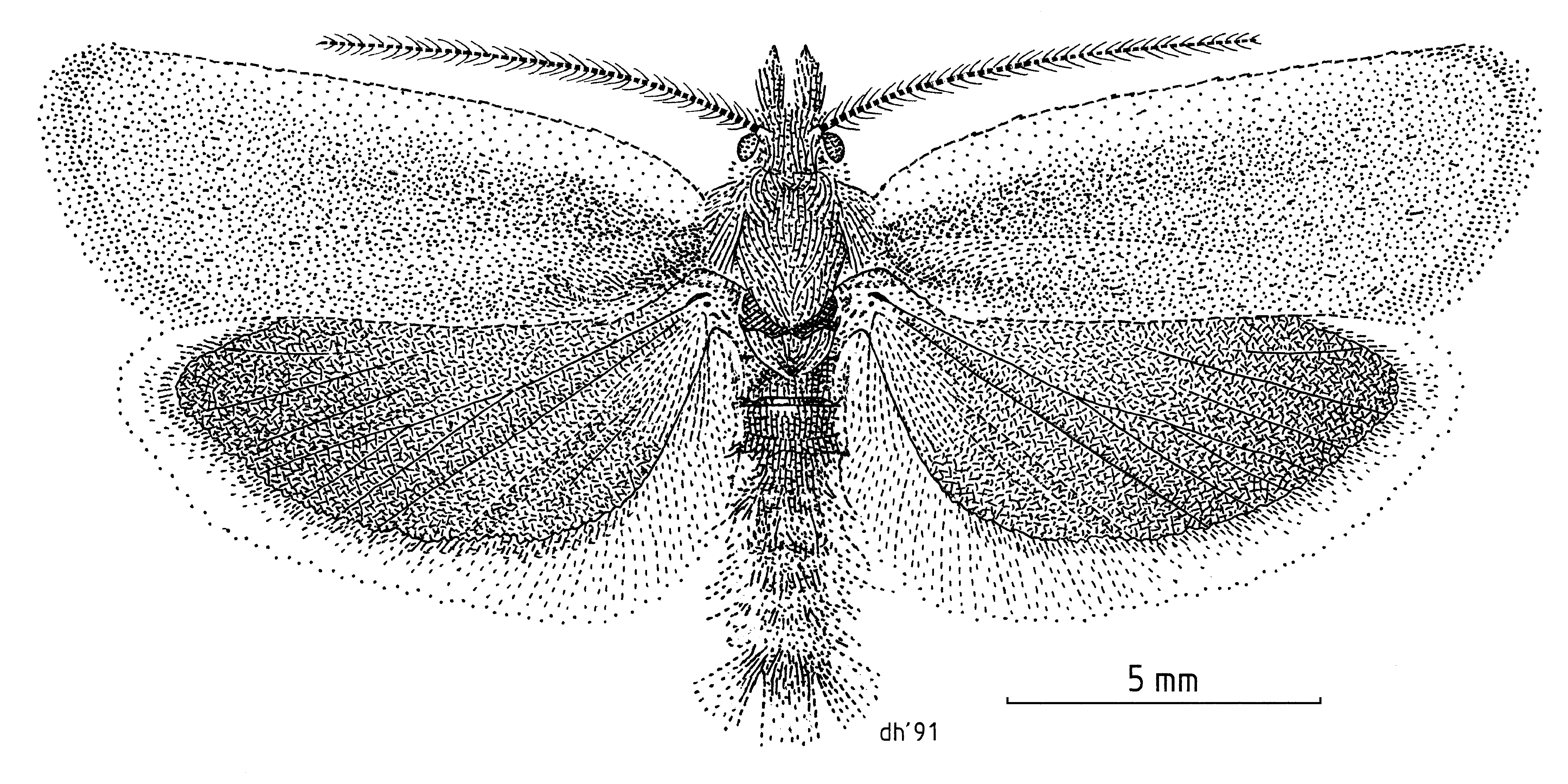
- Male

Scientific classification
- Domain: Eukaryota
- Kingdom: Animalia
- Phylum: Arthropoda
- Class: Insecta
- Order: Lepidoptera
- Family: Tortricidae
- Genus: Ascerodes
- Species: A. prochlora

Binomial name
- Ascerodes prochlora Meyrick, 1905

Synonyms
- Harmologa tritochlora Meyrick, 1912

= Ascerodes prochlora =

Species of moth

Ascerodes prochlora is a species of moth of the family Tortricidae. It is found in New Zealand.

The larvae feed on Aciphylla species and Senecio lyalli. They bore into the rootstock of their host plant.
