= Syllomatia pertinax =

Scientific classification
- Kingdom: Animalia
- Phylum: Arthropoda
- Class: Insecta
- Order: Lepidoptera
- Family: Tortricidae
- Genus: Syllomatia
- Species: S. pertinax

Binomial name
- Syllomatia pertinax (Meyrick, 1910)

Synonyms
- Arotrophora pertinax Meyrick, 1910; Arotrophora amorpha Turner, 1945; Arotrophora labyrinthodes Turner, 1915

Species of moth

Syllomatia pertinax is a species of moth of the family Tortricidae. It is found in Australia, where it has been recorded from New South Wales and Victoria.

The wingspan is about 17.5–19 mm.
