= Nuritamburia phyllanthana =

Scientific classification
- Domain: Eukaryota
- Kingdom: Animalia
- Phylum: Arthropoda
- Class: Insecta
- Order: Lepidoptera
- Family: Tortricidae
- Genus: Nuritamburia
- Species: N. phyllanthana

Binomial name
- Nuritamburia phyllanthana (Swezey, 1940)

Synonyms
- Tortrix phyllanthana Swezey, 1940; Bradleyella phyllanthana

Species of moth

Nuritamburia phyllanthana is a moth of the family Tortricidae. It was first described by Otto Swezey in 1940. It is endemic to the Hawaiian island of Oahu.
