= Schoenotenes emmetra =

Scientific classification
- Kingdom: Animalia
- Phylum: Arthropoda
- Class: Insecta
- Order: Lepidoptera
- Family: Tortricidae
- Genus: Schoenotenes
- Species: S. emmetra

Binomial name
- Schoenotenes emmetra Razowski, 2013

Species of moth

Schoenotenes emmetra is a species of moth of the family Tortricidae first described by Józef Razowski in 2013. It is found on Seram Island in Indonesia.

The wingspan is about 19 mm.
