= Digitosa stenographa =

Scientific classification
- Kingdom: Animalia
- Phylum: Arthropoda
- Clade: Pancrustacea
- Class: Insecta
- Order: Lepidoptera
- Family: Tortricidae
- Genus: Digitosa
- Species: D. stenographa

Binomial name
- Digitosa stenographa Diakonoff, 1970

Species of moth

Digitosa stenographa is a species of moth of the family Tortricidae. It is found in Madagascar.
