= Epagoge mellosa =

Scientific classification
- Domain: Eukaryota
- Kingdom: Animalia
- Phylum: Arthropoda
- Class: Insecta
- Order: Lepidoptera
- Family: Tortricidae
- Genus: Epaggoge
- Species: E. mellosa

Binomial name
- Epagoge mellosa Diakonoff, 1951

Species of moth

Epagoge mellosa is a species of moth of the family Tortricidae. It is found on Java in Indonesia.
