= Isochorista acrodesma =

Scientific classification
- Kingdom: Animalia
- Phylum: Arthropoda
- Class: Insecta
- Order: Lepidoptera
- Family: Tortricidae
- Genus: Isochorista
- Species: I. acrodesma

Binomial name
- Isochorista acrodesma (Lower, 1902)

Synonyms
- Capua acrodesma Lower, 1902

Species of moth

Isochorista acrodesma is a species of moth of the family Tortricidae. It is found in Australia, where it has been recorded from New South Wales.

The wingspan is 12–15 mm. The forewings are light ashy-grey, mixed with whitish. There are about ten striae (lines) consisting of mixed black and ochreous scales. The hindwings are grey. Adults have been recorded on wing in September and October.
