= Terricula bifurcata =

Scientific classification
- Domain: Eukaryota
- Kingdom: Animalia
- Phylum: Arthropoda
- Class: Insecta
- Order: Lepidoptera
- Family: Tortricidae
- Genus: Terricula
- Species: T. bifurcata

Binomial name
- Terricula bifurcata Wang & Li, 2004

Species of moth

Terricula bifurcata is a species of moth of the family Tortricidae. It is found in Hunan, China.
