= Terricula graphitana =

Scientific classification
- Kingdom: Animalia
- Phylum: Arthropoda
- Class: Insecta
- Order: Lepidoptera
- Family: Tortricidae
- Genus: Terricula
- Species: T. graphitana

Binomial name
- Terricula graphitana Razowski, 2009

Species of moth

Terricula graphitana is a species of moth of the family Tortricidae. It is found in Vietnam.
