= Nuritamburia thoracina =

Scientific classification
- Domain: Eukaryota
- Kingdom: Animalia
- Phylum: Arthropoda
- Class: Insecta
- Order: Lepidoptera
- Family: Tortricidae
- Genus: Nuritamburia
- Species: N. thoracina

Binomial name
- Nuritamburia thoracina (Walsingham, 1907)

Synonyms
- Tortrix thoracina Walsingham, 1907; Bradleyella thoracina; Eulia thoracina

Species of moth

Nuritamburia thoracina is a moth of the family Tortricidae. It was first described by Lord Walsingham in 1907. It is endemic to the Hawaiian islands of Kauai and Oahu.

The larvae feed on Perrottetia species.
