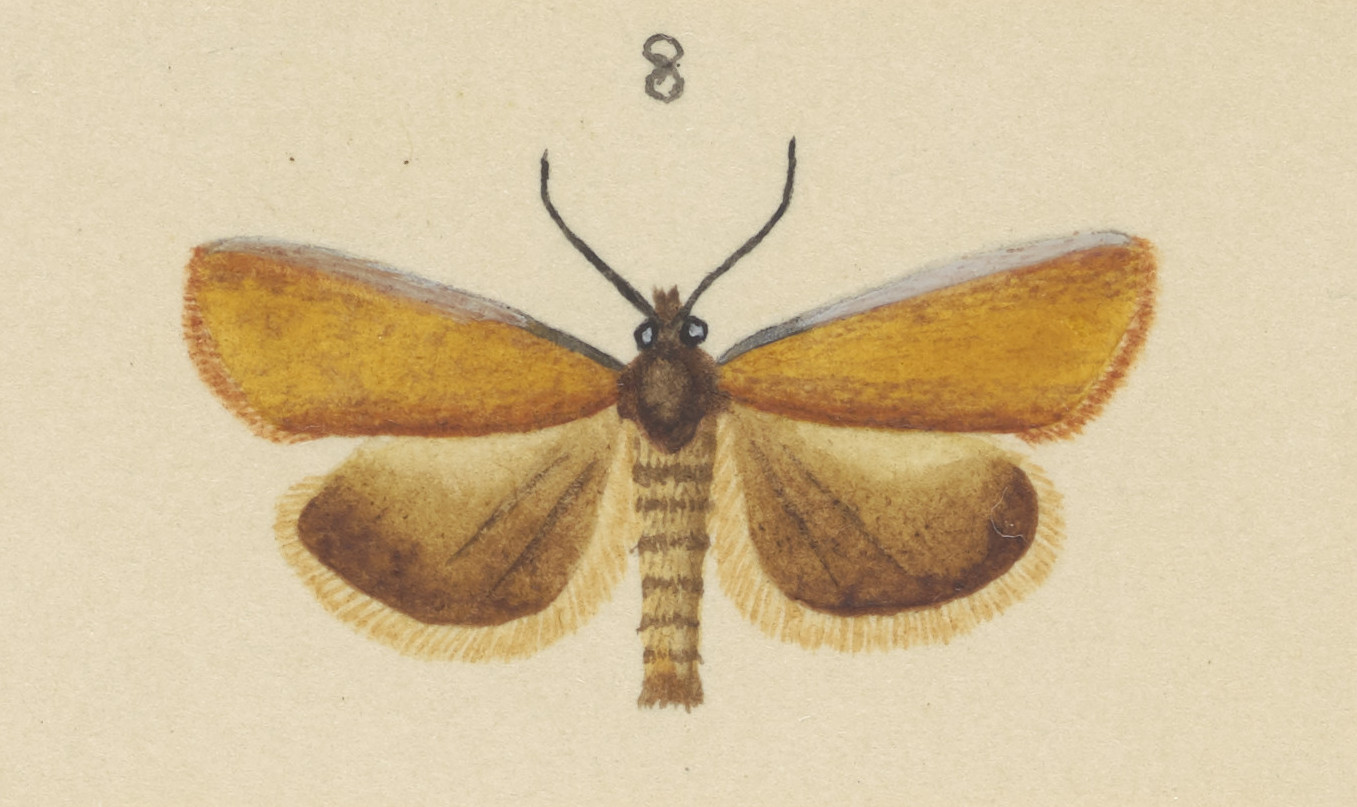
- Illustration by George Hudson

Scientific classification
- Kingdom: Animalia
- Phylum: Arthropoda
- Class: Insecta
- Order: Lepidoptera
- Family: Tortricidae
- Genus: Gelophaula
- Species: G. aenea

Binomial name
- Gelophaula aenea (Butler, 1877)

Synonyms
- Teras aenea Butler, 1877

= Gelophaula aenea =

Species of moth

Gelophaula aenea is a species of moth of the family Tortricidae. It is endemic to New Zealand.

== Hosts ==
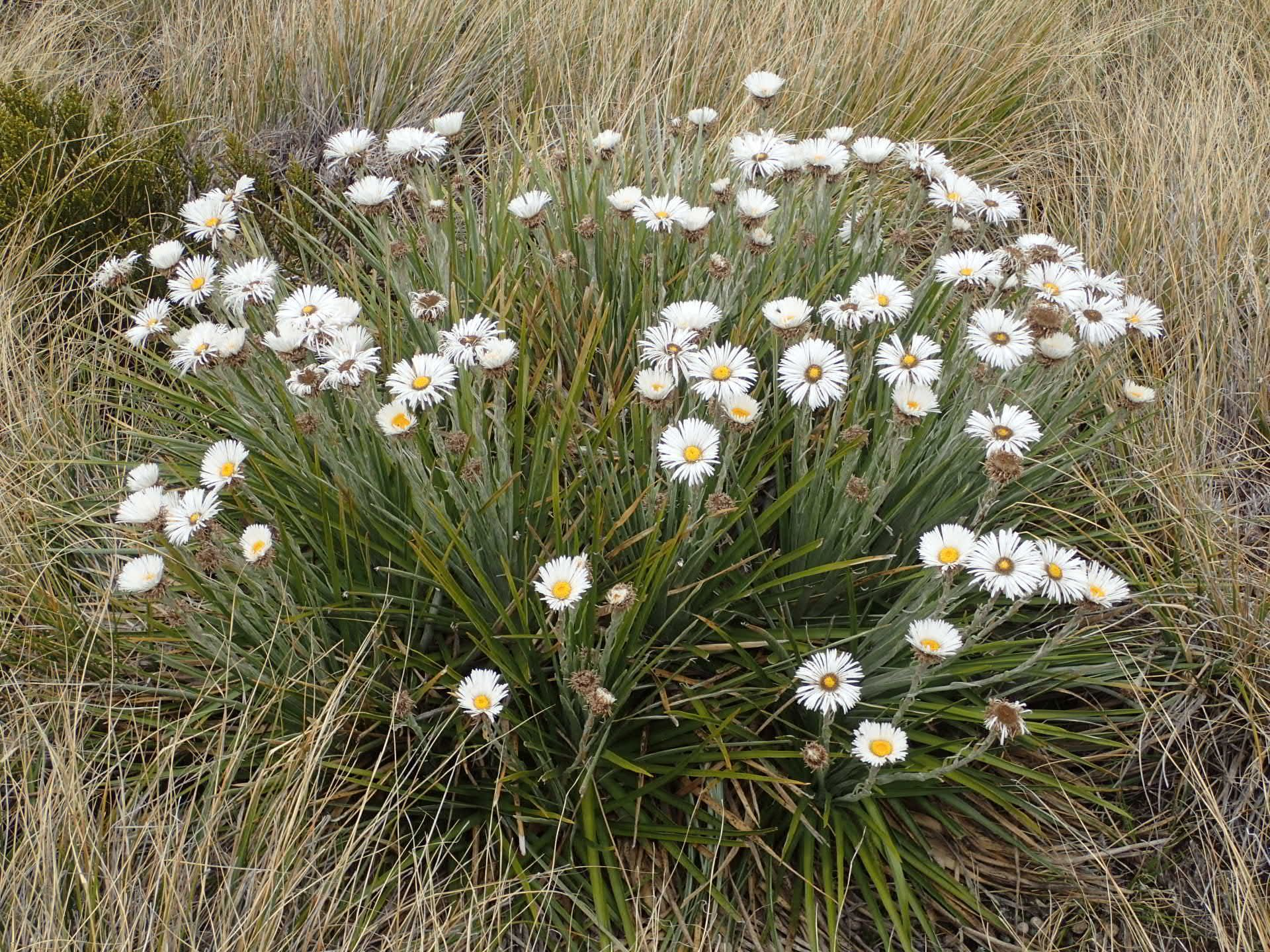
Celmisia lyallii, the larval host of G. aenea.

The larvae bore through the developing leaves of Celmisia lyalli.
