= Stenarchella eupista =

Scientific classification
- Kingdom: Animalia
- Phylum: Arthropoda
- Class: Insecta
- Order: Lepidoptera
- Family: Tortricidae
- Genus: Stenarchella
- Species: S. eupista

Binomial name
- Stenarchella eupista Diakonoff, 1968

Species of moth

Montane ecosystem

Stenarchella eupista is a species of moth of the family Tortricidae first described by Alexey Diakonoff in 1968. It is found in the Philippines on the islands of Luzon and Mindanao and in Indonesia on Seram Island. The habitat consists of lower montane forests.
