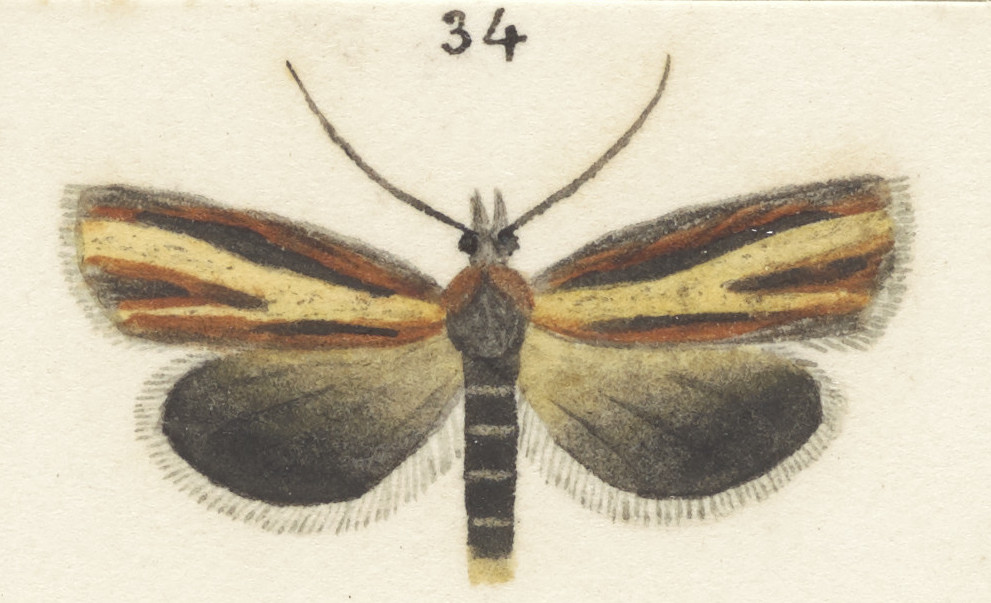

Scientific classification
- Domain: Eukaryota
- Kingdom: Animalia
- Phylum: Arthropoda
- Class: Insecta
- Order: Lepidoptera
- Family: Tortricidae
- Genus: Gelophaula
- Species: G. tributaria

Binomial name
- Gelophaula tributaria (Philpott, 1913)

Synonyms
- Harmologa tributaria Philpott, 1913

= Gelophaula tributaria =

Species of moth

Gelophaula tributaria is a species of moth of the family Tortricidae. It is found in New Zealand.

The wingspan is about 25 mm. The forewings are dark fuscous with reddish scales and a broad irregular pale-yellow streak from the base to the apex. The hindwings are fuscous.
