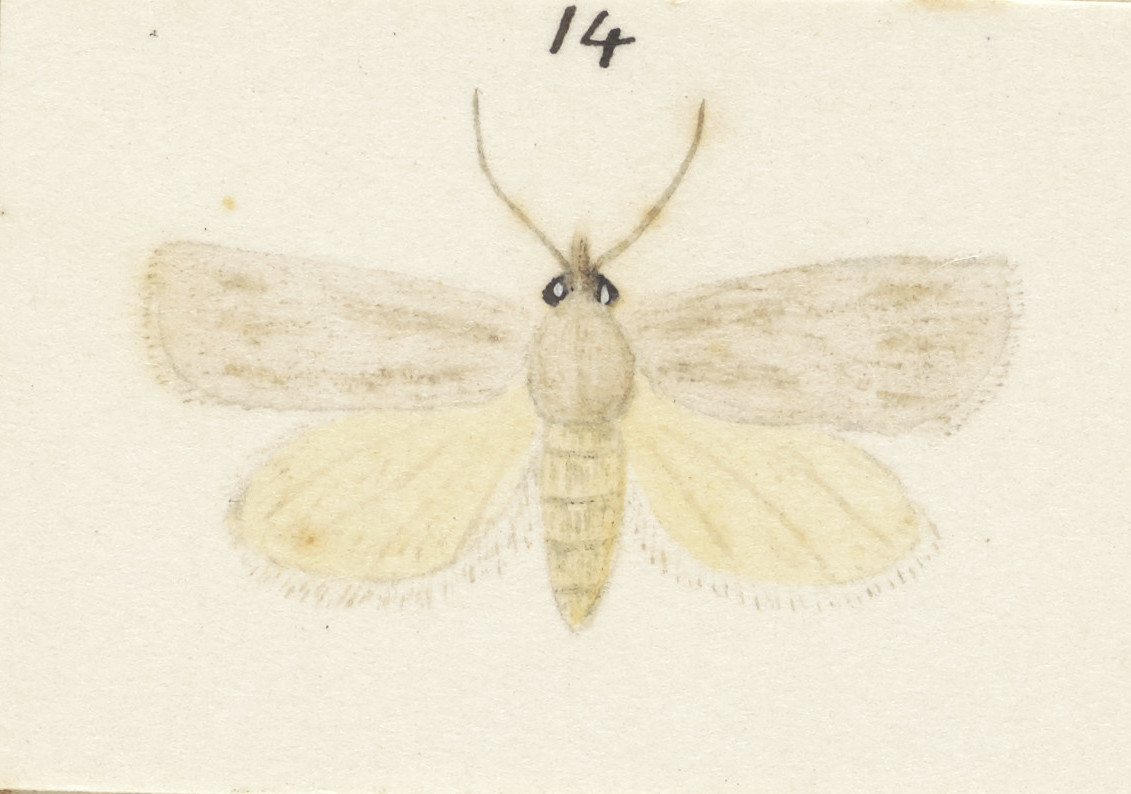
- Illustration of female
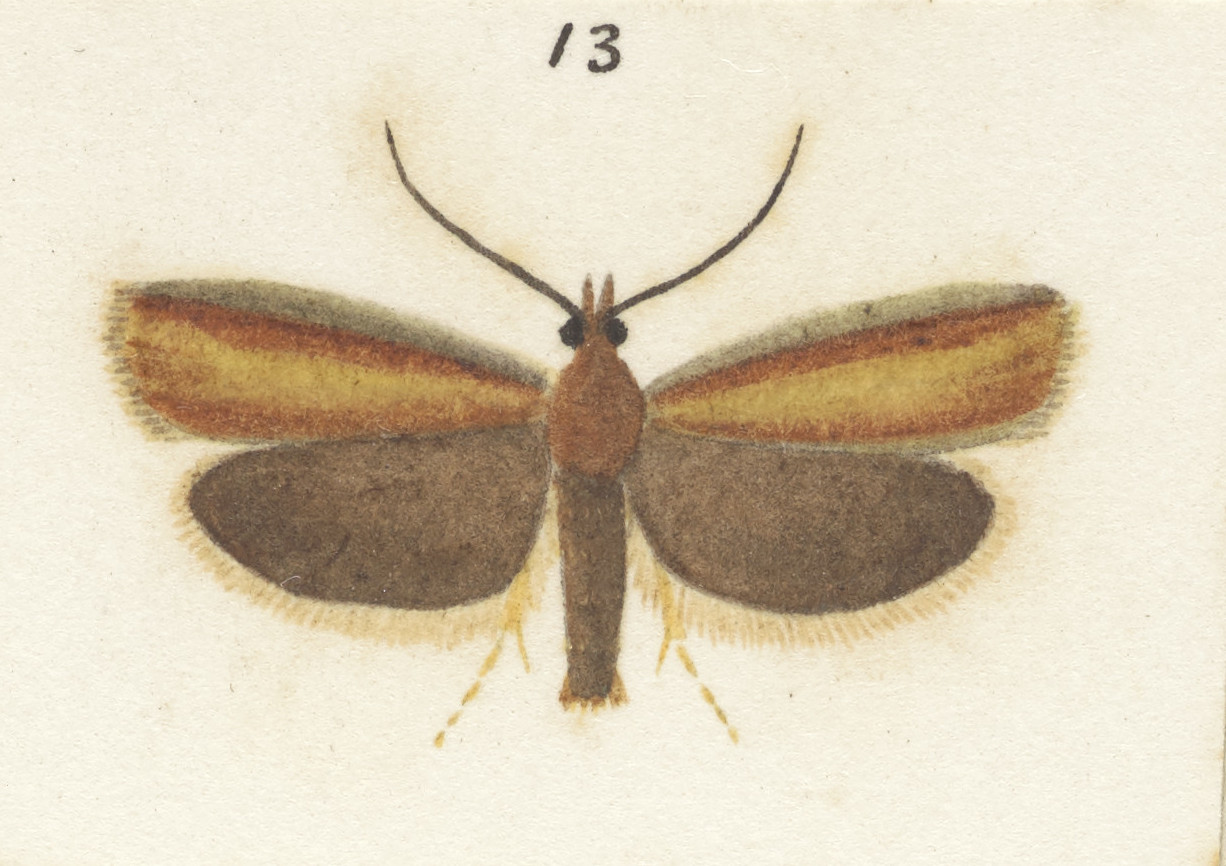
- Illustration of male

Scientific classification
- Kingdom: Animalia
- Phylum: Arthropoda
- Class: Insecta
- Order: Lepidoptera
- Family: Tortricidae
- Genus: Gelophaula
- Species: G. siraea

Binomial name
- Gelophaula siraea (Meyrick, 1885)

Synonyms
- Harmologa siraea Meyrick, 1885; Harmologa brevicula Meyrick, 1921

= Gelophaula siraea =

Species of moth

Gelophaula siraea is a species of moth of the family Tortricidae. It is found in New Zealand.

The wingspan is about 23 mm. The forewings are pale greyish, mixed with yellow whitish and more yellowish tinged towards the dorsum. The hindwings are whitish, tinged greyish on the dorsal half.
