= Cuspidata ditoma =

Scientific classification
- Domain: Eukaryota
- Kingdom: Animalia
- Phylum: Arthropoda
- Class: Insecta
- Order: Lepidoptera
- Family: Tortricidae
- Genus: Cuspidata
- Species: C. ditoma

Binomial name
- Cuspidata ditoma Diakonoff, 1960

Species of moth

Cuspidata ditoma is a species of moth of the family Tortricidae. It is found in Madagascar.

== Subspecies ==
- Cuspidata ditoma ditoma
- Cuspidata ditoma peratra Diakonoff, 1973
