= Balioxena iospila =

Scientific classification
- Kingdom: Animalia
- Phylum: Arthropoda
- Clade: Pancrustacea
- Class: Insecta
- Order: Lepidoptera
- Family: Tortricidae
- Genus: Balioxena
- Species: B. iospila

Binomial name
- Balioxena iospila Meyrick, 1912

Synonyms
- Balioxena ospila Meyrick, in Wagner, 1912

Species of moth

Balioxena iospila is a species of moth of the family Tortricidae. It is found in Madagascar.
