= Geogepa monticola =

Scientific classification
- Domain: Eukaryota
- Kingdom: Animalia
- Phylum: Arthropoda
- Class: Insecta
- Order: Lepidoptera
- Family: Tortricidae
- Genus: Geogepa
- Species: G. monticola

Binomial name
- Geogepa monticola Jinbo, 2004

Species of moth

Geogepa monticola is a species of moth of the family Tortricidae. It is found on the island of Honshu in Japan. The habitat consists of subalpine and alpine forests.

The length of the forewings is 6.5–8.5 mm in males and 7–8.5 mm in females. There is one generation per year.
