= Geogepa malacotorna =

Scientific classification
- Kingdom: Animalia
- Phylum: Arthropoda
- Class: Insecta
- Order: Lepidoptera
- Family: Tortricidae
- Genus: Geogepa
- Species: G. malacotorna

Binomial name
- Geogepa malacotorna (Meyrick, 1931)

Synonyms
- Capua malacotorna Meyrick, 1931

Species of moth

Geogepa malacotorna is a species of moth of the family Tortricidae. It is found in Taiwan.
