= Anisolepida =

Scientific classification
- Kingdom: Animalia
- Phylum: Arthropoda
- Class: Insecta
- Order: Lepidoptera
- Family: Tortricidae
- Subfamily: Tortricinae
- Genus: Anisolepida

Genus of tortrix moths

Anisolepida is a genus of moths belonging to the subfamily Tortricinae of the family Tortricidae.

== See also ==
- List of Tortricidae genera
