= Diplocalyptis tennuicula =

Scientific classification
- Kingdom: Animalia
- Phylum: Arthropoda
- Class: Insecta
- Order: Lepidoptera
- Family: Tortricidae
- Genus: Diplocalyptis
- Species: D. tennuicula

Binomial name
- Diplocalyptis tennuicula Razowski, 1984

Species of moth

Diplocalyptis tennuicula is a species of moth of the family Tortricidae. It is found in Zhejiang, China.
