= Diplocalyptis nigricana =

Scientific classification
- Kingdom: Animalia
- Phylum: Arthropoda
- Clade: Pancrustacea
- Class: Insecta
- Order: Lepidoptera
- Family: Tortricidae
- Genus: Diplocalyptis
- Species: D. nigricana

Binomial name
- Diplocalyptis nigricana (Yasuda, 1975)

Synonyms
- Argyrotaenia nigricana Yasuda, 1975

Species of moth

Diplocalyptis nigricana is a species of moth of the family Tortricidae. It is found on the island of Shikoku in Japan.
