= Diplocalyptis triangulifera =

Scientific classification
- Kingdom: Animalia
- Phylum: Arthropoda
- Class: Insecta
- Order: Lepidoptera
- Family: Tortricidae
- Genus: Diplocalyptis
- Species: D. triangulifera

Binomial name
- Diplocalyptis triangulifera Razowski, 2009

Species of moth

Diplocalyptis triangulifera is a moth of the family Tortricidae which is endemic to Vietnam.

The wingspan is 16 millimetres (0.63 in).
