= Cuspidata obscura =

Scientific classification
- Domain: Eukaryota
- Kingdom: Animalia
- Phylum: Arthropoda
- Class: Insecta
- Order: Lepidoptera
- Family: Tortricidae
- Genus: Cuspidata
- Species: C. obscura

Binomial name
- Cuspidata obscura Diakonoff, 1970

Species of moth

Cuspidata obscura is a species of moth of the family Tortricidae first described by Alexey Diakonoff in 1970. It is found on Madagascar.
