= Terricula cnephaeana =

Scientific classification
- Domain: Eukaryota
- Kingdom: Animalia
- Phylum: Arthropoda
- Class: Insecta
- Order: Lepidoptera
- Family: Tortricidae
- Genus: Terricula
- Species: T. cnephaeana

Binomial name
- Terricula cnephaeana Razowski, 2008

Species of moth

Terricula cnephaeana is a moth of the family Tortricidae. It is found in Vietnam.

The wingspan is 26 mm.
