= Ioditis =

Scientific classification
- Domain: Eukaryota
- Kingdom: Animalia
- Phylum: Arthropoda
- Class: Insecta
- Order: Lepidoptera
- Family: Tortricidae
- Subfamily: Tortricinae
- Genus: Ioditis; Meyrick, 1938,

Genus of tortrix moths

Ioditis is a genus of moths belonging to the subfamily Tortricinae of the family Tortricidae.

== Species ==
- Ioditis capnobactra Meyrick, 1938
- Ioditis mokwae Razowski, 2013

== See also ==
- List of Tortricidae genera
