= Metachorista longiseta =

Scientific classification
- Kingdom: Animalia
- Phylum: Arthropoda
- Class: Insecta
- Order: Lepidoptera
- Family: Tortricidae
- Genus: Metachorista
- Species: M. longiseta

Binomial name
- Metachorista longiseta Razowski, 2013

Species of moth

Metachorista longiseta is a species of moth of the family Tortricidae first described by Józef Razowski in 2013. It is found on Seram Island in Indonesia.

The wingspan is about 18 mm.
