= Terricula major =

Scientific classification
- Kingdom: Animalia
- Phylum: Arthropoda
- Class: Insecta
- Order: Lepidoptera
- Family: Tortricidae
- Genus: Terricula
- Species: T. major

Binomial name
- Terricula major Razowski, 2008

Species of moth

Terricula major is a moth of the family Tortricidae. It is found in Vietnam.

The wingspan is 18 mm.
