= Geogepa nigropunctata =

Scientific classification
- Kingdom: Animalia
- Phylum: Arthropoda
- Class: Insecta
- Order: Lepidoptera
- Family: Tortricidae
- Genus: Geogepa
- Species: G. nigropunctata

Binomial name
- Geogepa nigropunctata Kawabe, 1985

Species of moth

Geogepa nigropunctata is a species of moth of the family Tortricidae. It is found in Taiwan.
