= Hydaranthes =

Scientific classification
- Kingdom: Animalia
- Phylum: Arthropoda
- Class: Insecta
- Order: Lepidoptera
- Family: Tortricidae
- Subfamily: Tortricinae
- Genus: Hydaranthes; Meyrick, 1928

Genus of tortrix moths

Hydaranthes is a genus of moths belonging to the subfamily Tortricinae of the family Tortricidae.

== Species ==
- Hydaranthes deltographa Meyrick, 1928

== See also ==
- List of Tortricidae genera
