= Diplocalyptis operosa =

Scientific classification
- Domain: Eukaryota
- Kingdom: Animalia
- Phylum: Arthropoda
- Class: Insecta
- Order: Lepidoptera
- Family: Tortricidae
- Genus: Diplocalyptis
- Species: D. operosa

Binomial name
- Diplocalyptis operosa (Meyrick, 1908)

Synonyms
- Cacoecia operosa Meyrick, 1908; Tortrix operosa Clarke, 1958

Species of moth

Diplocalyptis operosa is a species of moth of the family Tortricidae first described by Edward Meyrick in 1908. It is found in Sri Lanka, Sumatra, and Taiwan.
