= Diplocalyptis apona =

Scientific classification
- Domain: Eukaryota
- Kingdom: Animalia
- Phylum: Arthropoda
- Class: Insecta
- Order: Lepidoptera
- Family: Tortricidae
- Genus: Diplocalyptis
- Species: D. apona

Binomial name
- Diplocalyptis apona Diakonoff, 1976

Species of moth

Diplocalyptis apona is a species of moth of the family Tortricidae. It is found in Nepal and Vietnam.
