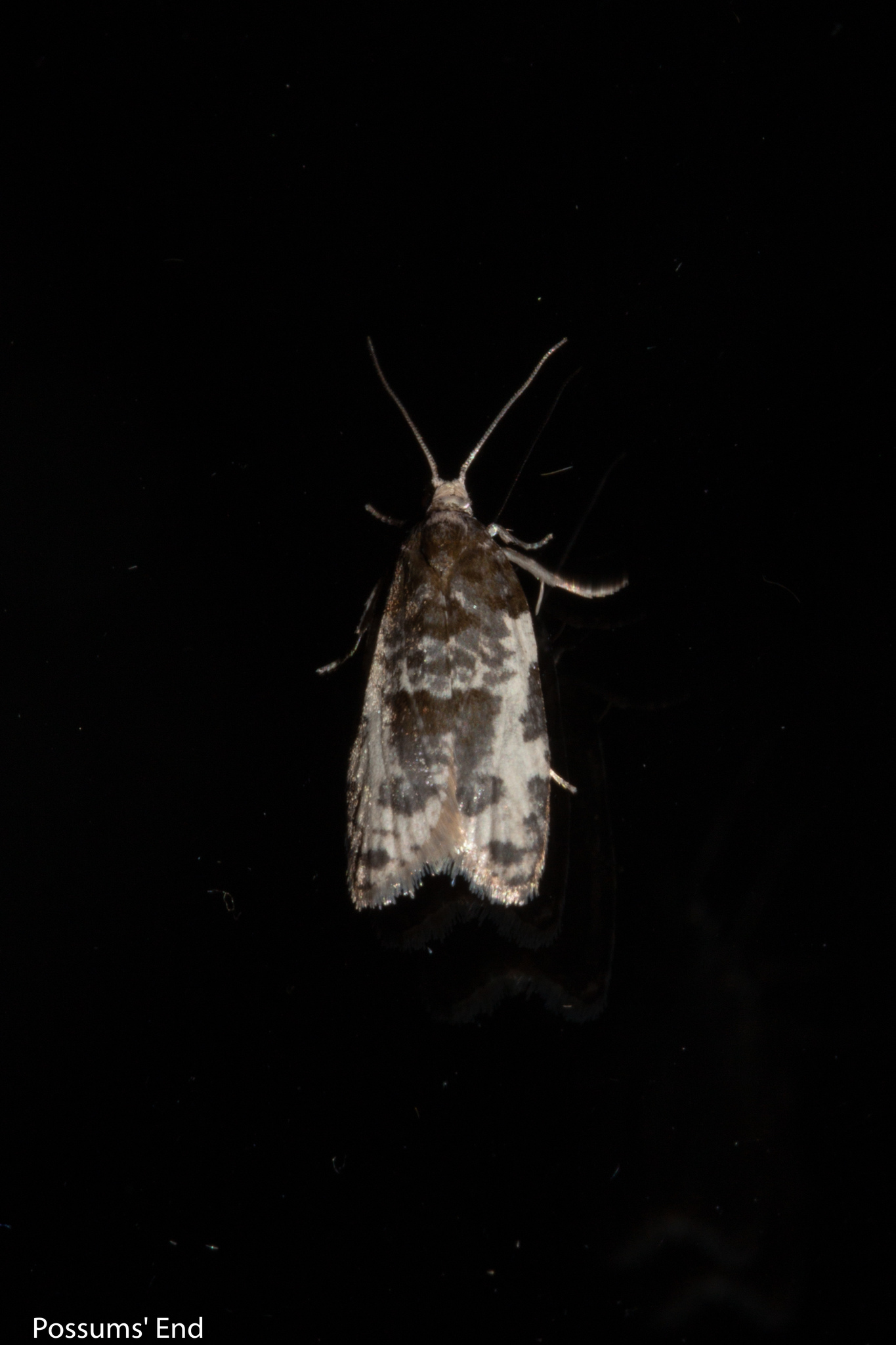

Scientific classification
- Kingdom: Animalia
- Phylum: Arthropoda
- Class: Insecta
- Order: Lepidoptera
- Family: Tortricidae
- Genus: Prothelymna
- Species: P. niphostrota

Binomial name
- Prothelymna niphostrota (Meyrick, 1907)

Synonyms
- Proselena niphostrota Meyrick, 1907

= Prothelymna niphostrota =

Species of moth endemic to New Zealand

Prothelymna niphostrota is a species of moth in the family Tineidae first described by Edward Meyrick in 1907. This species is endemic to New Zealand.
