= Diplocalyptis ferruginimixta =

Scientific classification
- Domain: Eukaryota
- Kingdom: Animalia
- Phylum: Arthropoda
- Class: Insecta
- Order: Lepidoptera
- Family: Tortricidae
- Genus: Diplocalyptis
- Species: D. ferruginimixta

Binomial name
- Diplocalyptis ferruginimixta Razowski, 2009

Species of moth

Diplocalyptis ferruginimixta is a moth of the family Tortricidae which is endemic to Vietnam.

The wingspan is 12.5 millimetres (0.49 in).

== Etymology ==
The specific name refers to ferruginous colouration of the median fascia and is derived from Latin mixta (meaning mixed).
