= Labidosa sogai =

Scientific classification
- Domain: Eukaryota
- Kingdom: Animalia
- Phylum: Arthropoda
- Class: Insecta
- Order: Lepidoptera
- Family: Tortricidae
- Genus: Labidosa
- Species: L. sogai

Binomial name
- Labidosa sogai Diakonoff, 1960

Species of moth

Labidosa sogai is a species of moth of the family Tortricidae. It is found in Madagascar.
