= Snodgrassia calliplecta =

Scientific classification
- Kingdom: Animalia
- Phylum: Arthropoda
- Class: Insecta
- Order: Lepidoptera
- Family: Tortricidae
- Genus: Snodgrassia
- Species: S. calliplecta

Binomial name
- Snodgrassia calliplecta Diakonoff, 1983

Species of moth

Snodgrassia calliplecta is a species of moth of the family Tortricidae. It is found on Sulawesi in Indonesia.
