= Cornuticlava kobipoto =

Scientific classification
- Kingdom: Animalia
- Phylum: Arthropoda
- Class: Insecta
- Order: Lepidoptera
- Family: Tortricidae
- Genus: Cornuticlava
- Species: C. kobipoto

Binomial name
- Cornuticlava kobipoto Razowski, 2013

Species of moth

Cornuticlava kobipoto is a species of moth of the family Tortricidae first described by Józef Razowski in 2013. It is found on Seram Island in Indonesia. The habitat consists of forests at altitudes between 500 and 1,500 meters.

The wingspan is about 18.5 mm.
