= Snodgrassia buruana =

Scientific classification
- Kingdom: Animalia
- Phylum: Arthropoda
- Class: Insecta
- Order: Lepidoptera
- Family: Tortricidae
- Genus: Snodgrassia
- Species: S. buruana

Binomial name
- Snodgrassia buruana (Diakonoff, 1941)

Synonyms
- Syndemis buruana Diakonoff, 1941

Species of moth

Snodgrassia buruana is a species of moth of the family Tortricidae. It is found on the Maluku Islands of Indonesia, where it has been recorded from the island of Buru.
