= Isochorista helota =

Scientific classification
- Kingdom: Animalia
- Phylum: Arthropoda
- Class: Insecta
- Order: Lepidoptera
- Family: Tortricidae
- Genus: Isochorista
- Species: I. helota

Binomial name
- Isochorista helota Meyrick, 1910

Species of moth

Isochorista helota is a species of moth of the family Tortricidae. It is found in Australia, where it has been recorded from New South Wales, Victoria and Tasmania. The habitat consists of tall wet eucalypt forests.

The wingspan is about 10 mm.
