= Isochorista pumicosa =

Scientific classification
- Kingdom: Animalia
- Phylum: Arthropoda
- Class: Insecta
- Order: Lepidoptera
- Family: Tortricidae
- Genus: Isochorista
- Species: I. pumicosa

Binomial name
- Isochorista pumicosa Meyrick, 1910

Species of moth

Isochorista pumicosa is a species of moth of the family Tortricidae. It is found in Australia, where it has been recorded from Victoria and Tasmania.

The wingspan is 12.5 mm. The forewings are ashy fuscous with about ten black striae (lines), somewhat mixed with ferruginous scales, on the costal edge separated by whitish scales. The hindwings are dark fuscous, but darker posteriorly. Adults have been recorded on wing in February.
