= Epagoge vulgaris =

Scientific classification
- Kingdom: Animalia
- Phylum: Arthropoda
- Class: Insecta
- Order: Lepidoptera
- Family: Tortricidae
- Genus: Epaggoge
- Species: E. vulgaris

Binomial name
- Epagoge vulgaris (Meyrick, 1921)

Synonyms
- Capua vulgaris Meyrick, 1921; Capua saltuaria Meyrick, 1922

Species of moth

Epagoge vulgaris is a species of moth of the family Tortricidae. It is found on Java in Indonesia.

The wingspan 12–14 mm. The forewings light greyish ochreous or brownish, more or less mixed irregularly with brownish crimson and fuscous. The markings are formed by irregular dark grey suffusion and blackish strigulation (fine streaks). There is a well-marked basal patch. The hindwings are pale grey, indistinctly mottled with grey.
