= Isochorista melanocrypta =

Scientific classification
- Kingdom: Animalia
- Phylum: Arthropoda
- Class: Insecta
- Order: Lepidoptera
- Family: Tortricidae
- Genus: Isochorista
- Species: I. melanocrypta

Binomial name
- Isochorista melanocrypta Meyrick, 1910

Species of moth

Isochorista melanocrypta is a species of moth of the family Tortricidae. It is found in Australia, where it has been recorded from Queensland and New South Wales.

The wingspan is 11–12 mm. The forewings are light purplish grey with markings consisting of mixed ferruginous and black scales. The hindwings are grey. Adults have been recorded on wing in October.
