= Diplocalyptis shanpingana =

Scientific classification
- Kingdom: Animalia
- Phylum: Arthropoda
- Class: Insecta
- Order: Lepidoptera
- Family: Tortricidae
- Tribe: Archipini
- Genus: Diplocalyptis
- Species: D. shanpingana

Binomial name
- Diplocalyptis shanpingana Razowski, 2000

Synonyms
- Diplocalyptis shanpinganus

Species of moth

Diplocalyptis shanpingana, also amended to Diplocalyptis shanpinganus, is a moth of the family Tortricidae. It is found in Taiwan.

The wingspan is 13–14 mm. Adults are on wing from late March to mid-May. It has been caught in Shanping, Kaohsiung, at 640 m (2,100 ft) above sea level.
