= Gelophaula vana =

Scientific classification
- Domain: Eukaryota
- Kingdom: Animalia
- Phylum: Arthropoda
- Class: Insecta
- Order: Lepidoptera
- Family: Tortricidae
- Genus: Gelophaula
- Species: G. vana

Binomial name
- Gelophaula vana Philpott, 1928

Species of moth

Gelophaula vana is a species of moth of the family Tortricidae. It is found in New Zealand.

The wingspan is 26–29 mm for males and 29–32 mm for females. The forewings of the males have a yellow median stripe. Females have pale yellow forewings, sprinkled with fuscous. The hindwings are white, dusted with grey. Adults have been recorded on wing in December and January.
