= Schoenotenes capnosema =

Scientific classification
- Domain: Eukaryota
- Kingdom: Animalia
- Phylum: Arthropoda
- Class: Insecta
- Order: Lepidoptera
- Family: Tortricidae
- Genus: Schoenotenes
- Species: S. capnosema

Binomial name
- Schoenotenes capnosema Turner, 1918

Species of moth

Schoenotenes capnosema is a species of moth of the family Tortricidae. It is found in Australia, where it was first recorded from Norfolk Island by Alfred Jefferis Turner in 1917, and named in 1918. The species was mentioned again (with no additional observations) in further catalogues of species, one of which includes an illustration of the captured specimen's genitalia.

The wingspan is about 17 mm. The forewings are whitish with silvery reflections, crossed by numerous fine, wavy ochreous-brown transverse striae and with various small tufts of raised scales. The hindwings are grey.
