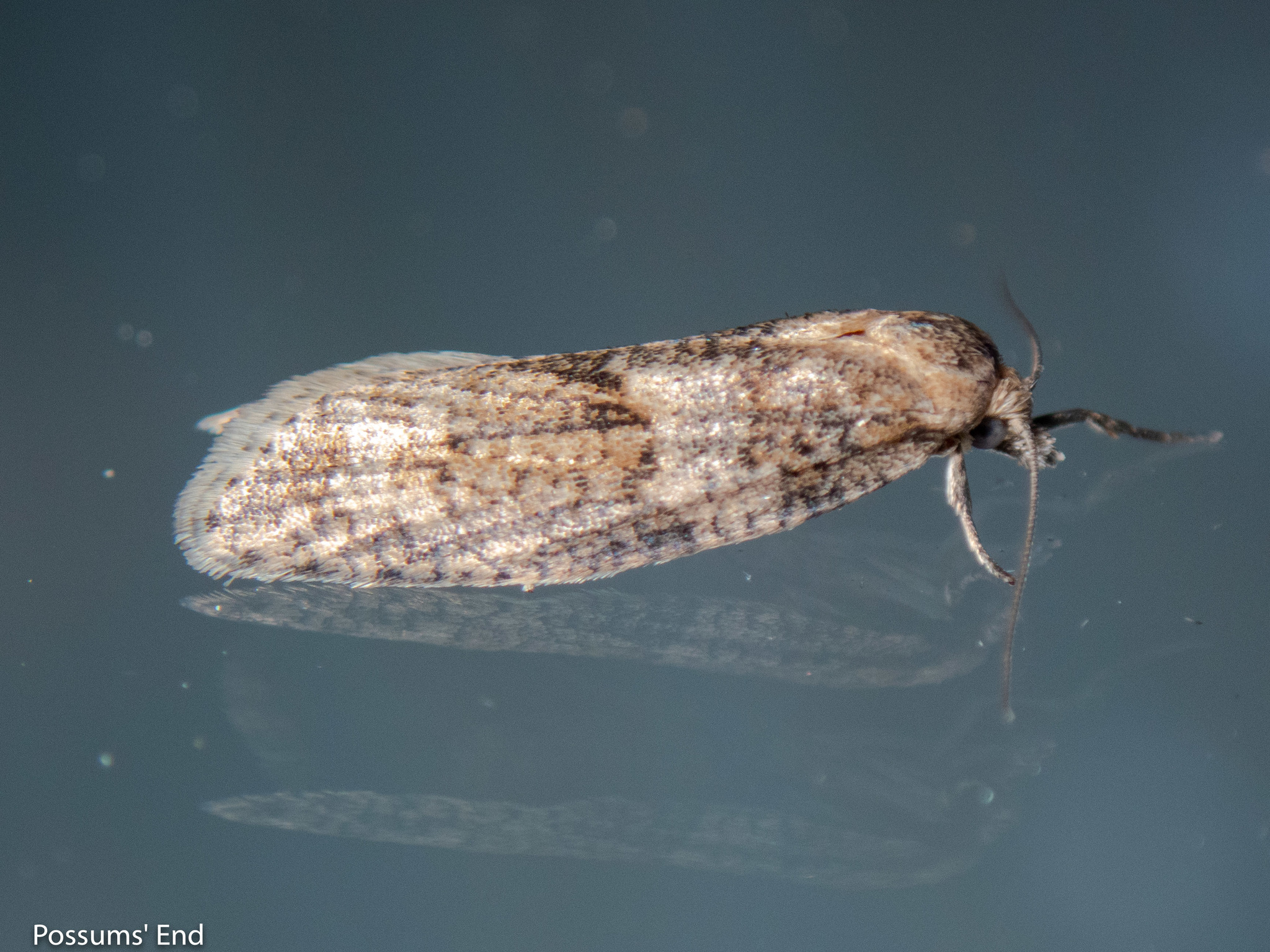

Scientific classification
- Kingdom: Animalia
- Phylum: Arthropoda
- Class: Insecta
- Order: Lepidoptera
- Family: Tortricidae
- Genus: Prothelymna
- Species: P. antiquana

Binomial name
- Prothelymna antiquana (Walker, 1863)

Synonyms
- Teras antiquana Walker, 1863; Proselena antiquana (Walker, 1863)

= Prothelymna antiquana =

Species of moth endemic to New Zealand

Prothelymna antiquana is a species of moth in the family Tineidae first described by Francis Walker in 1863. This species is endemic to New Zealand.
