= Nuritamburia chlorocalla =

Scientific classification
- Domain: Eukaryota
- Kingdom: Animalia
- Phylum: Arthropoda
- Class: Insecta
- Order: Lepidoptera
- Family: Tortricidae
- Genus: Nuritamburia
- Species: N. chlorocalla

Binomial name
- Nuritamburia chlorocalla (Walsingham in Sharp, 1907)

Synonyms
- Tortrix chlorocalla Walsingham in Sharp, 1907; Bradleyella chlorocalla; Eulia chlorocalla

Species of moth

Nuritamburia chlorocalla is a moth of the family Tortricidae. It was first described by Lord Walsingham in 1907. It is endemic to the island of Hawaii.
