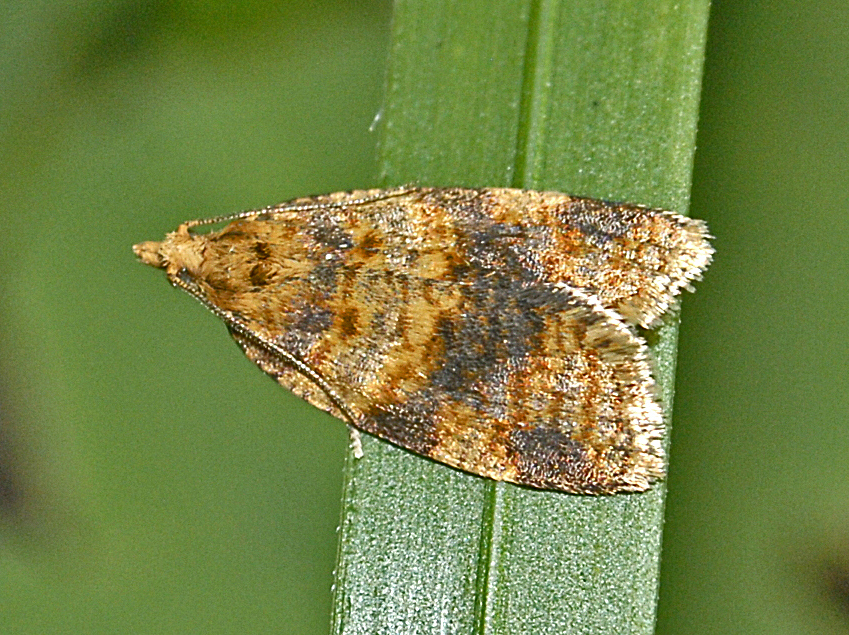
- Dorsal view
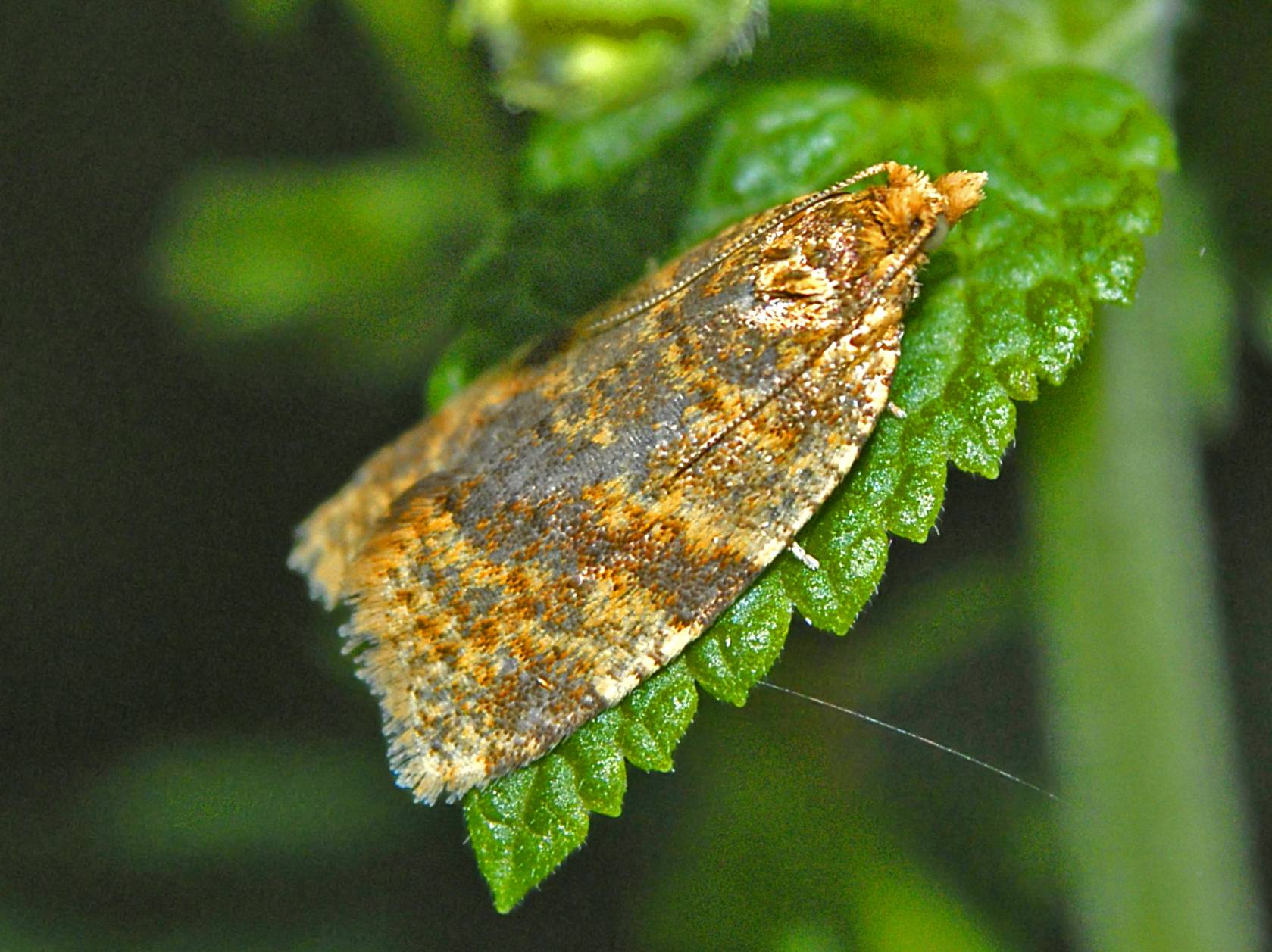
- Lateral view

Scientific classification
- Kingdom: Animalia
- Phylum: Arthropoda
- Clade: Pancrustacea
- Class: Insecta
- Order: Lepidoptera
- Family: Tortricidae
- Genus: Epaggoge
- Species: E. grotiana

Binomial name
- Epagoge grotiana (Fabricius, 1781)

Synonyms
- List: Pyralis grotiana Fabricius, 1781; Dichelia grotiana var. amasiana Caradja, 1916; artificana Herrich-Schaffer, 1847; Tortrix (Argyrotosa) artificana Herrich-Schaffer, 1851; Tortrix flavana Hubner, [1796-1799]

= Epagoge grotiana =

Species of moth

Epagoge grotiana, common name brown-barred tortrix, is a moth of the family Tortricidae, first described by Johan Christian Fabricius in 1781.

== Description ==
Epagoge grotiana has a wingspan of about 13–17 millimetres (0.51–0.67 in). Forewings have a yellowish ochreous ground colour with brown markings. Adults are on wing from June to August and are active around dusk and at dawn. The larvae mainly feed on oak, Crataegus and Rubus species. They live within a rolled leaf, where they also overwinter.

== Distribution and habitat ==
This species can be found in most of Europe and in the Near East. It mainly occurs in deciduous woodlands and on sand-dunes.
