= Geogepa stenochorda =

Scientific classification
- Domain: Eukaryota
- Kingdom: Animalia
- Phylum: Arthropoda
- Class: Insecta
- Order: Lepidoptera
- Family: Tortricidae
- Genus: Geogepa
- Species: G. stenochorda

Binomial name
- Geogepa stenochorda (Diakonoff, 1948)

Synonyms
- Epagoge stenochorda Diakonoff, 1948; Batodes stenochorda; Heterochorista stenochorda

Species of moth

Geogepa stenochorda is a species of moth of the family Tortricidae. It is found in Japan on the islands of Hokkaido, Honshu, Shikoku and Kyushu and in China in the province of Anhui.

The length of the forewings is 5.5–7.5 mm in males and 7–8.5 mm in females. There is one generation per year.
