= Paracomotis =

Scientific classification
- Kingdom: Animalia
- Phylum: Arthropoda
- Class: Insecta
- Order: Lepidoptera
- Family: Tortricidae
- Subfamily: Tortricinae
- Genus: Paracomotis; Razowski, 1982

Species
- See text

Genus of tortrix moths

Paracomotis is a genus of moths belonging to the family Tortricidae.

== Species ==
- Paracomotis smaragdophaea (Meyrick, 1932)
