= Isochorista parmiferana =

Scientific classification
- Kingdom: Animalia
- Phylum: Arthropoda
- Class: Insecta
- Order: Lepidoptera
- Family: Tortricidae
- Genus: Isochorista
- Species: I. parmiferana

Binomial name
- Isochorista parmiferana (Meyrick, 1881)

Synonyms
- Capua parmiferana Meyrick, 1881

Species of moth

Isochorista parmiferana is a species of moth of the family Tortricidae. It is found in Australia, where it has been recorded from New South Wales.

The wingspan is about 12 mm. Adults have been recorded on wing in September, October and March.
