= Syllomatia =

Scientific classification
- Domain: Eukaryota
- Kingdom: Animalia
- Phylum: Arthropoda
- Class: Insecta
- Order: Lepidoptera
- Family: Tortricidae
- Subfamily: Tortricinae
- Genus: Syllomatia; Common, 1963

Genus of tortrix moths

Syllomatia is a genus of moths belonging to the subfamily Tortricinae of the family Tortricidae.

== Species ==
- Syllomatia pertinax (Meyrick, 1910)
- Syllomatia pirastis (Meyrick, 1910)
- Syllomatia xythopterana (Meyrick, 1881)

== See also ==
- List of Tortricidae genera
