= Diactenis youngi =

Scientific classification
- Kingdom: Animalia
- Phylum: Arthropoda
- Class: Insecta
- Order: Lepidoptera
- Family: Tortricidae
- Genus: Diactenis
- Species: D. youngi

Binomial name
- Diactenis youngi Razowski, 2000

Species of moth

Diactenis youngi is a moth of the family Tortricidae. It is found in Taiwan.

The wingspan is 7.5 mm. The ground colour of the forewings is cream suffused with ochreous and dotted with brown between the median veins. The hindwings are white cream. Adults are on wing in mid-May.
