= Isochorista encotodes =

Scientific classification
- Kingdom: Animalia
- Phylum: Arthropoda
- Class: Insecta
- Order: Lepidoptera
- Family: Tortricidae
- Genus: Isochorista
- Species: I. encotodes

Binomial name
- Isochorista encotodes Meyrick, 1910

Species of moth

Isochorista encotodes is a species of moth of the family Tortricidae. It is found in Australia, where it has been recorded from Tasmania and the Australian Capital Territory. The habitat consists of tall wet eucalypt forests.

The wingspan is about 12.5 mm.
