= Syllomatia xythopterana =

Scientific classification
- Kingdom: Animalia
- Phylum: Arthropoda
- Class: Insecta
- Order: Lepidoptera
- Family: Tortricidae
- Genus: Syllomatia
- Species: S. xythopterana

Binomial name
- Syllomatia xythopterana (Meyrick, 1881)

Synonyms
- Arotrophora xythopterana Meyrick, 1881; Arotrophora ammodes Meyrick, 1910

Species of moth

Syllomatia xythopterana is a species of moth of the family Tortricidae. It is found in Australia, where it has been recorded from New South Wales, Victoria and Tasmania. The habitat consists of open forests.

The wingspan is about 17.5 mm.
