= Tanychaeta =

Scientific classification
- Kingdom: Animalia
- Phylum: Arthropoda
- Class: Insecta
- Order: Lepidoptera
- Family: Tortricidae
- Subfamily: Tortricinae
- Genus: Tanychaeta; Common, 1963

Genus of tortrix moths

Tanychaeta is a genus of moths belonging to the subfamily Tortricinae of the family Tortricidae.

== Species ==
- Tanychaeta neanthes (Turner, 1933)

== See also ==
- List of Tortricidae genera
