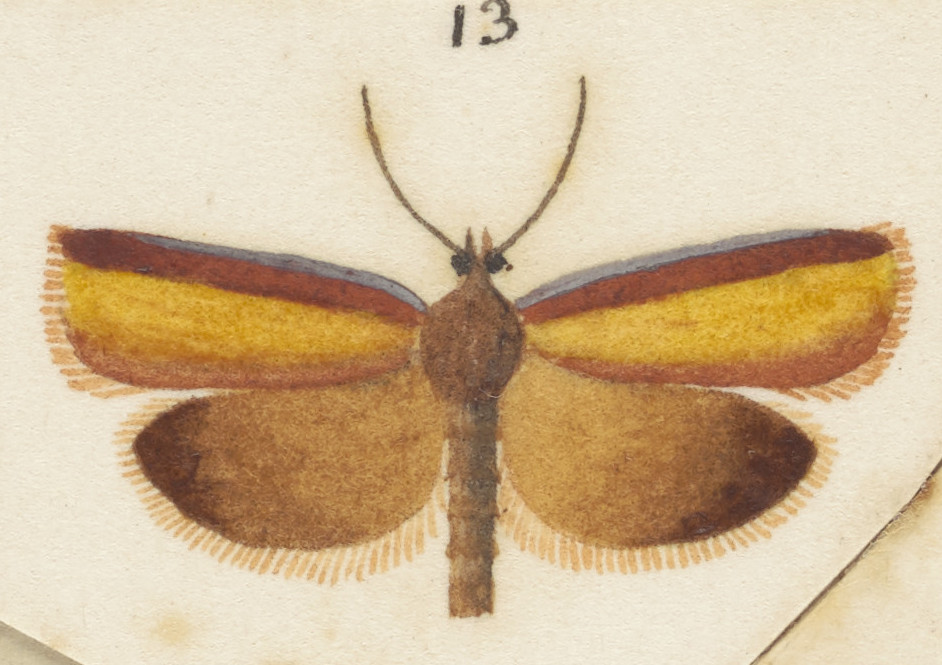

Scientific classification
- Kingdom: Animalia
- Phylum: Arthropoda
- Class: Insecta
- Order: Lepidoptera
- Family: Tortricidae
- Genus: Gelophaula
- Species: G. lychnophanes

Binomial name
- Gelophaula lychnophanes (Meyrick, 1916)

Synonyms
- Harmologa lychnophanes Meyrick, 1916

= Gelophaula lychnophanes =

Species of moth

Gelophaula lychnophanes is a species of moth of the family Tortricidae. It is found in New Zealand.

The wingspan is about 28 mm. The forewings are ochreous yellowish, somewhat paler in the middle longitudinally. The costal third of the wing is bright deep ferruginous, but deep leaden grey along the costa. The hindwings are ochreous yellowish sprinkled with grey, becoming yellowish ferruginous towards the apex and termen.
