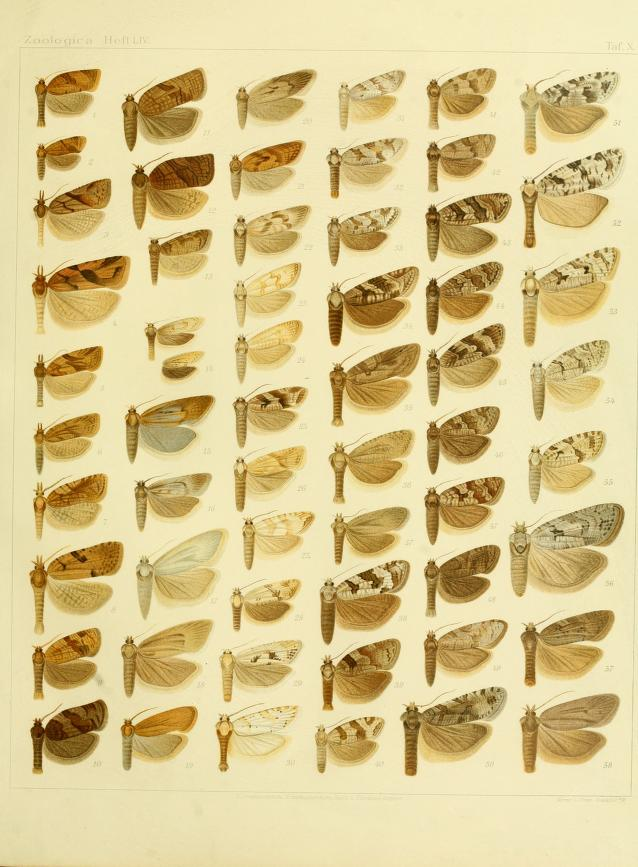
- Diplocalyptis congruentana in Kennel's Die palaearktischen tortriciden figure 2, female

Scientific classification
- Domain: Eukaryota
- Kingdom: Animalia
- Phylum: Arthropoda
- Class: Insecta
- Order: Lepidoptera
- Family: Tortricidae
- Genus: Diplocalyptis
- Species: D. congruentana

Binomial name
- Diplocalyptis congruentana (Kennel, 1901)

Synonyms
- Tortrix congruentana Kennel, 1901; Diplocalyptis cogruentana Yasuda, 1975; Tortrix liobathra Meyrick, 1923

= Diplocalyptis congruentana =

Species of moth

Diplocalyptis congruentana is a species of moth of the family Tortricidae. It is found in the Russian Far East (Primorsky Krai: Askold Island), Korea, Japan, China, Taiwan, and India (Assam. In Taiwan, it has been recorded at elevations between 550 and 1,900 m (1,800 and 6,230 ft) above sea level in March and June–August.
