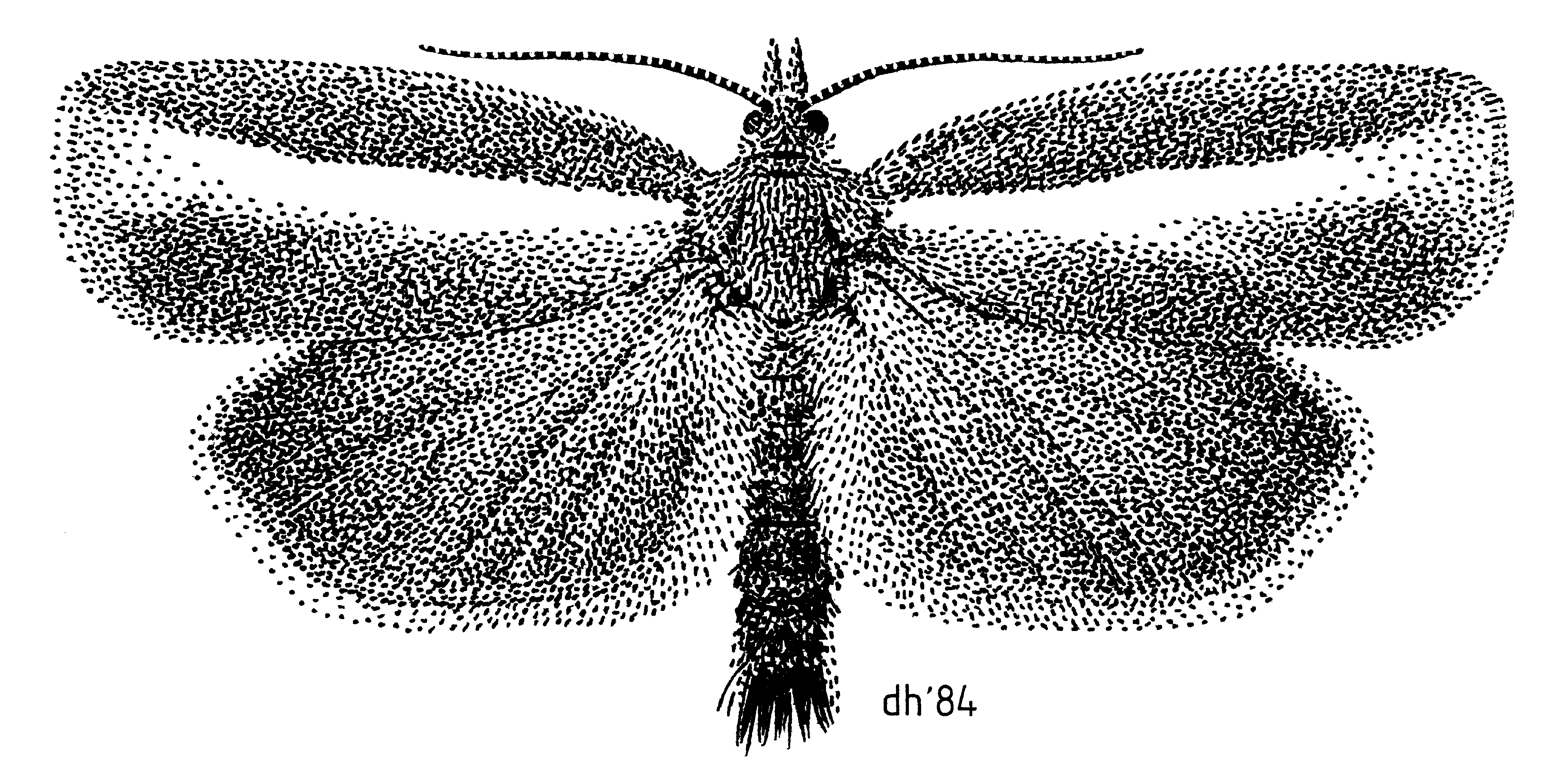

Scientific classification
- Kingdom: Animalia
- Phylum: Arthropoda
- Class: Insecta
- Order: Lepidoptera
- Family: Tortricidae
- Genus: Gelophaula
- Species: G. trisulca

Binomial name
- Gelophaula trisulca (Meyrick, 1916)

Synonyms
- Harmologa trisulca Meyrick, 1916

= Gelophaula trisulca =

Species of moth

Gelophaula trisulca is a species of moth of the family Tortricidae. It is found in New Zealand.

The wingspan is 29–31 mm for males and about 33 mm for females. The forewings of the males are deep ochreous yellow with a broad pale ochreous-yellowish median streak, suffused beneath and posteriorly. The costal area above the streak is deep red brown, the costal edge suffused with dark leaden grey. The dorsal third of the wing is suffused with ferruginous. The hindwings are dark grey, tinged with blackish towards the apex and termen. Females have pale ochreous-yellowish forewings with two dark-fuscous dots in the disc. The hindwings are pale whitish yellowish sprinkled with grey.
