= Epagoge metacentra =

Scientific classification
- Kingdom: Animalia
- Phylum: Arthropoda
- Class: Insecta
- Order: Lepidoptera
- Family: Tortricidae
- Genus: Epaggoge
- Species: E. metacentra

Binomial name
- Epagoge metacentra (Meyrick, 1918)

Synonyms
- Capua metacentra Meyrick, 1918

Species of moth

Epagoge metacentra is a species of moth of the family Tortricidae. It is found in India.
