= Nuritamburia semicineriana =

Scientific classification
- Domain: Eukaryota
- Kingdom: Animalia
- Phylum: Arthropoda
- Class: Insecta
- Order: Lepidoptera
- Family: Tortricidae
- Genus: Nuritamburia
- Species: N. semicinereana

Binomial name
- Nuritamburia semicinereana (Swezey, 1913)

Synonyms
- Tortrix semicinereana Swezey, 1913; Bradleyella semicinereana

Species of moth

Nuritamburia semicinereana is a moth of the family Tortricidae. It was first described by Otto Swezey in 1913. It is endemic to the island of Hawaii.
