= Nuritamburia metallurgica =

Scientific classification
- Domain: Eukaryota
- Kingdom: Animalia
- Phylum: Arthropoda
- Class: Insecta
- Order: Lepidoptera
- Family: Tortricidae
- Genus: Nuritamburia
- Species: N. metallurgica

Binomial name
- Nuritamburia metallurgica (Walsingham in Sharp, 1907)

Synonyms
- Tortrix metallurgica Walsingham in Sharp, 1907; Bradleyella metallurgica; Eulia metallurgica

Species of moth

Nuritamburia metallurgica is a moth of the family Tortricidae. It was first described by Lord Walsingham in 1907. It is endemic to the Hawaiian islands of Oahu, Molokai, Lanai and Hawaii.

The larvae possibly feed on Phyllanthus and Xylosma species.
