= Epagoge melanatma =

Scientific classification
- Kingdom: Animalia
- Phylum: Arthropoda
- Class: Insecta
- Order: Lepidoptera
- Family: Tortricidae
- Genus: Epaggoge
- Species: E. melanatma

Binomial name
- Epagoge melanatma (Meyrick, 1908)

Synonyms
- Capua melanatma Meyrick, 1908

Species of moth

Epagoge melanatma is a species of moth of the family Tortricidae. It is found in Assam, India.

The wingspan is 12–15 mm. The forewings are whitish-ochreous, with a few scattered ochreous strigulae (fine streaks) sprinkled with fuscous. The hindwings are light grey, somewhat strigulated with darker, posteriorly sometimes slightly tinged with whitish-ochreous.
