= Geogepa striatula =

Scientific classification
- Domain: Eukaryota
- Kingdom: Animalia
- Phylum: Arthropoda
- Class: Insecta
- Order: Lepidoptera
- Family: Tortricidae
- Genus: Geogepa
- Species: G. striatula

Binomial name
- Geogepa striatula Razowski, 2008

Species of moth

Geogepa striatula is a moth of the family Tortricidae. It is found in Vietnam.

The wingspan is 23 mm.

== Etymology ==
The name is derived from Latin stria (meaning strigula) and refers to the fine brown streaks of the forewing.
