= Paraphyas =

Scientific classification
- Kingdom: Animalia
- Phylum: Arthropoda
- Class: Insecta
- Order: Lepidoptera
- Family: Tortricidae
- Subfamily: Tortricinae
- Genus: Paraphyas; Turner, 1927
- Species: P. callixena

Binomial name
- Paraphyas callixena Turner, 1927

Monotypic genus of tortrix moths

Paraphyas is a genus of moths belonging to the subfamily Tortricinae of the family Tortricidae. It contains only one species, Paraphyas callixena, which is found in Australia, where it has been recorded from Western Australia and Tasmania. The habitat consists of wet sclerophyll forests.

The wingspan is about 14.5 mm.

== See also ==
- List of Tortricidae genera
