= Epagoge occidentalis =

Scientific classification
- Domain: Eukaryota
- Kingdom: Animalia
- Phylum: Arthropoda
- Class: Insecta
- Order: Lepidoptera
- Family: Tortricidae
- Genus: Epaggoge
- Species: E. occidentalis

Binomial name
- Epagoge occidentalis Diakonoff, 1948

Species of moth

Epagoge occidentalis is a species of moth of the family Tortricidae. It is found on Java in Indonesia.
