= Snodgrassia stenochorda =

Scientific classification
- Kingdom: Animalia
- Phylum: Arthropoda
- Class: Insecta
- Order: Lepidoptera
- Family: Tortricidae
- Genus: Snodgrassia
- Species: S. stenochorda

Binomial name
- Snodgrassia stenochorda (Meyrick, 1928)

Synonyms
- Cacoecia stenochorda Meyrick, 1928

Species of moth

Snodgrassia stenochorda is a species of moth of the family Tortricidae. It is found in the Philippines on the island of Luzon.
