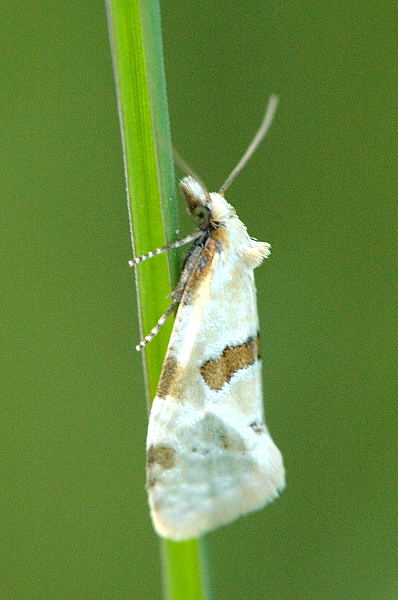
- Aethes cnicana

Scientific classification
- Kingdom: Animalia
- Phylum: Arthropoda
- Clade: Pancrustacea
- Class: Insecta
- Order: Lepidoptera
- Family: Tortricidae
- Subfamily: Tortricinae; Latreille, 1803

Tribes
- Archipini; Atteriini; Ceracini; Cnephasiini; Cochylini; Epitymbiini; Euliini; Phricanthini; Schoenotenini; Sparganothini; Tortricini and see text

= Tortricinae =

Subfamily of tortrix moths

The Tortricinae are the nominate subfamily of tortrix moths. Commonly referred to as leafrollers, as the larvae build shelters by folding or rolling leaves of the food plant, the tortricinae include several notable pests as well species used as biological control agents against invasive weeds.

== Genera incertae sedis ==
These tortricine genera have not been assigned to a tribe yet:

- Anisolepida
- Apateta
- Apinoglossa
- Arotrophora
- Camadeniana
- Deltisosciaria
- Hydaranthes
- Ioditis
- Matronula
- Paracomotis
- Paraphyas
- Parastranga
- Peraglyphis
- Syllomatia
- Symphygas
- Tanychaeta

== Former genera ==
Alytopistis (synonym of Ardiosteres)

== Life cycle ==
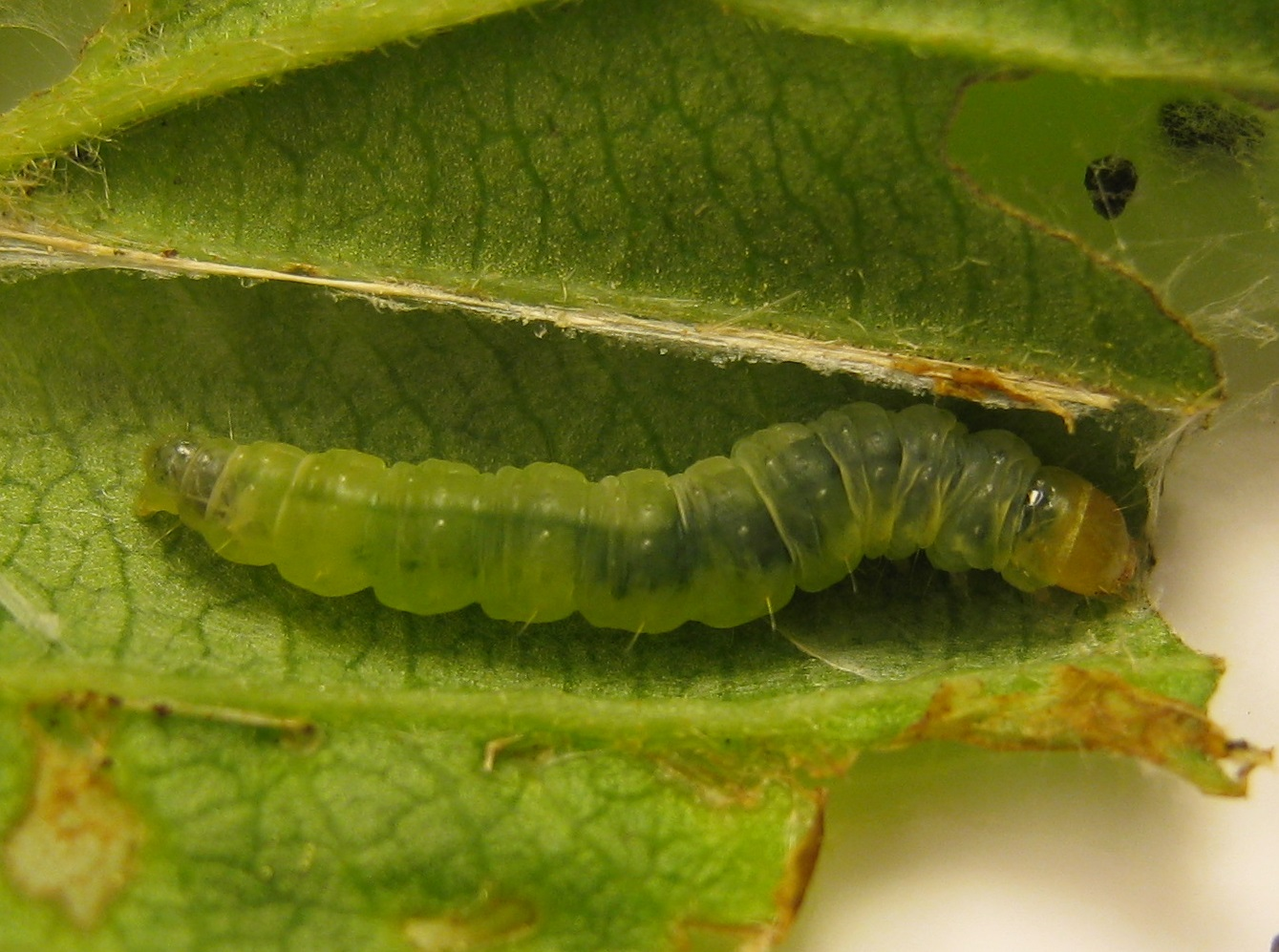
Caterpillar of Acleris schalleriana inside rolled leaf of Viburnum dentatum

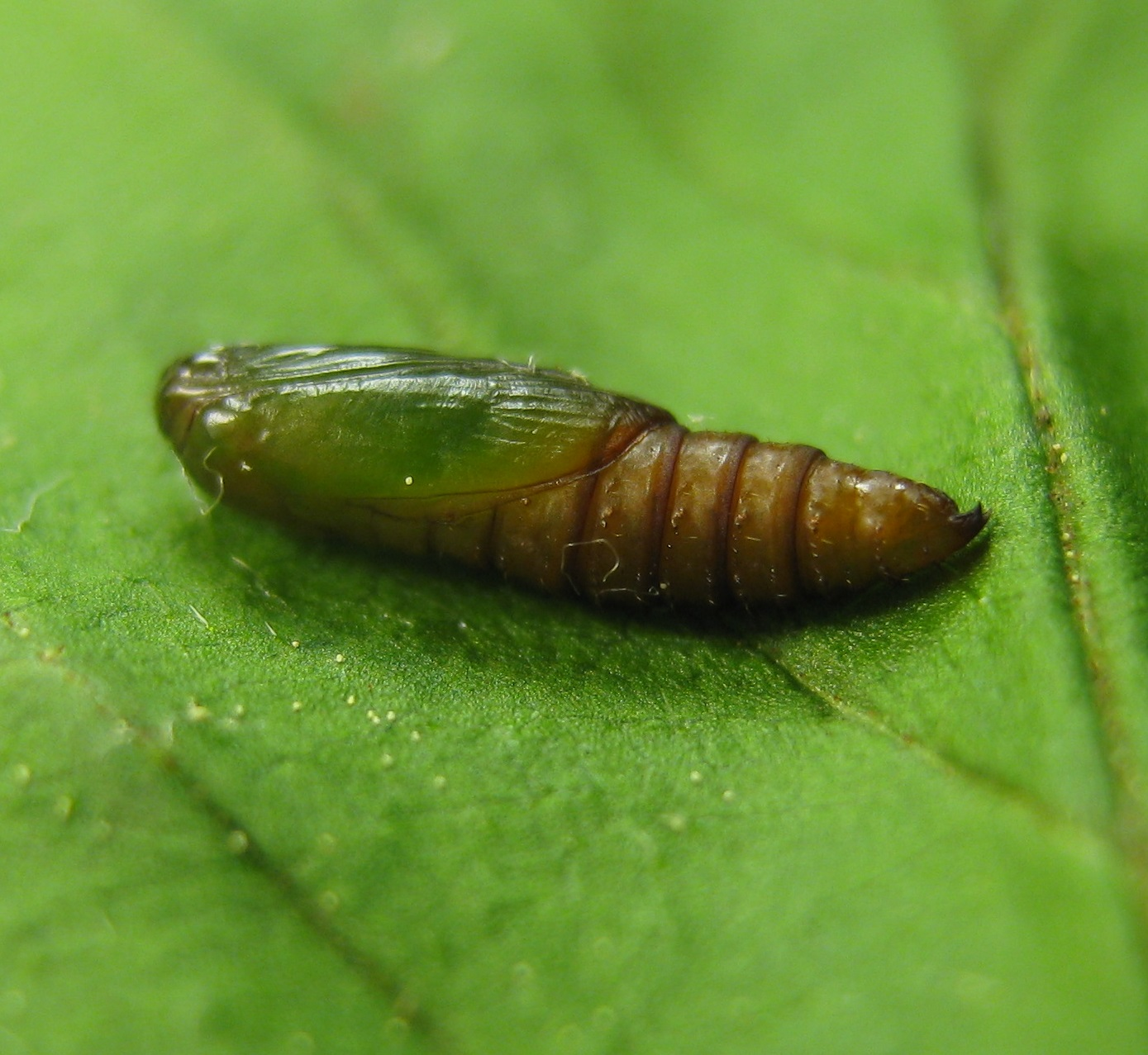
Pupa

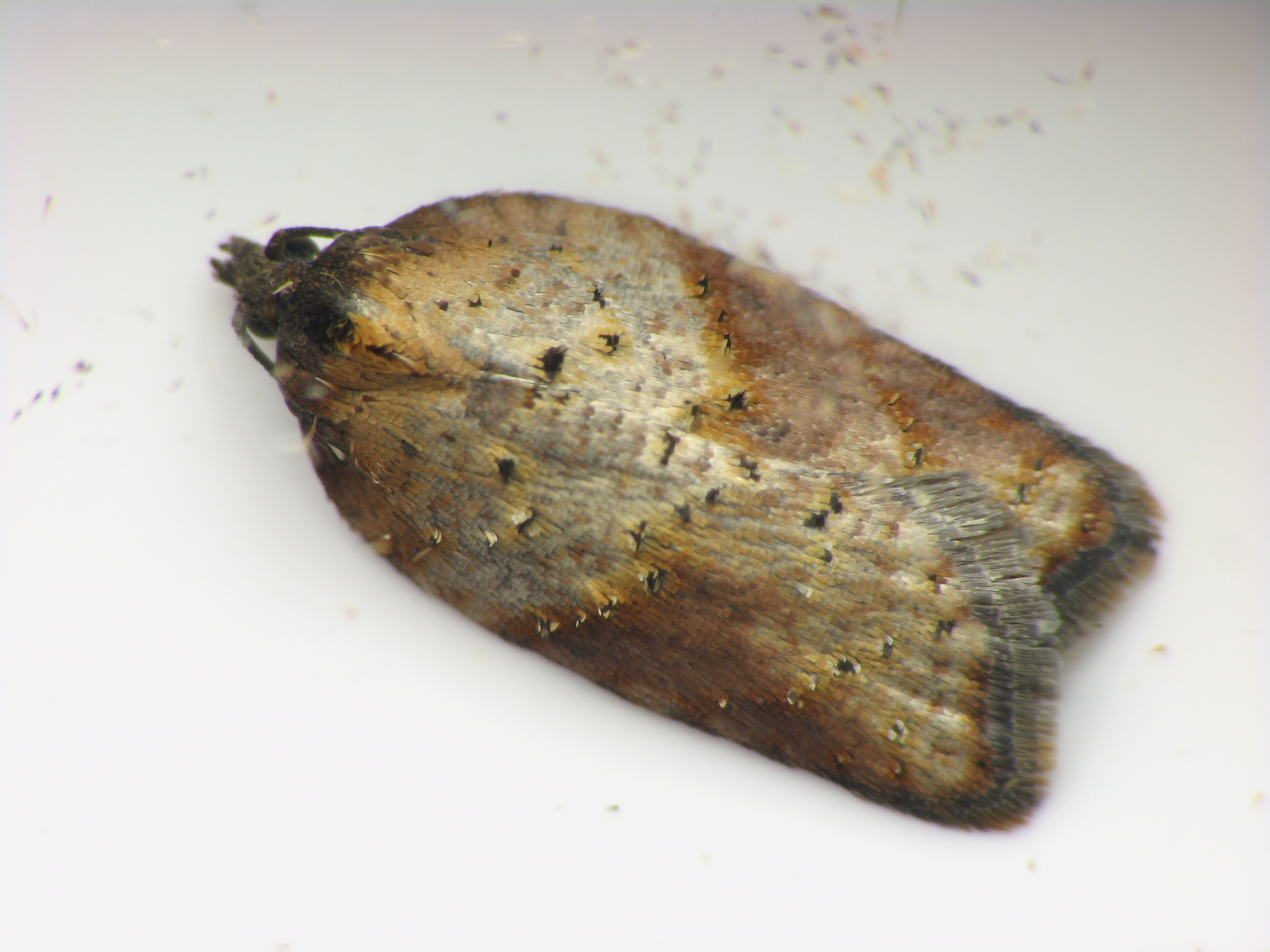
Adult
