= List of moths of India (Tortricidae) =

This is a list of moths of the family Tortricidae that are found in India. It also acts as an index to the species articles and forms part of the full List of moths of India.

== Species ==
- Adoxophyes privatana (Walker, 1863)
- Acleris chalcophanes (Meyrick, 1931)
- Acleris napaea (Meyrick, 1912)
- Acleris nectaritis (Meyrick, 1912)
- Acroclita notophthalma (Meyrick, 1933)
- Adoxophyes faeculosa (Meyrick, 1928)
- Agriophanes pycnostrota (Meyrick, 1930)
- Archips euryplintha (Meyrick, 1924)
- Archips hemixantha (Meyrick, 1928)
- Archips micaceana (Walker, 1863)
- Archips pensilis (Meyrick, 1920)
- Archips philippa (Meyrick, 1918)
- Archips termias (Meyrick, 1919)
- Argyroploce aprobola (Meyrick)
- Argyroploce citharistis (Meyrick)
- Aterpia mensifera (Meyrick, 1916)
- Capua chloraspis (Meyrick, 1924)
- Clepsis humana (Meyrick, 1912)
- Clepsis melissa (Meyrick)
- Cryptophlebia encarpa (Meyrick, 1920)
- Cryptophlebia illepida (Butler, 1882)
- Epagoge retractana (Walker)
- Erinaea microrrhyncha (Meyrick, 1931)
- Eucoenogenes melanancalis (Meyrick, 1937)
- Eucosma balanoptycha (Meyrick, 1910)
- Eucosma clepsidoma (Meyrick, 1916)
- Eucosma conciliata (Meyrick, 1916)
- Eucosma dryocarpa (Meyrick, 1925)
- Eucosma hypsidryas (Meyrick, 1925)
- Eucosma melanaula (Meyrick, 1916)
- Eucosma phoenocrossa (Meyrick, 1925)
- Eucosma subdecora (Meyrick, 1922)
- Eucosma xerophloea (Meyrick, 1933)
- Grapholitha palamedes (Meyrick, 1916)
- Grapholitha torodelta (Meyrick, 1914)
- Gypsonoma riparia (Meyrick, 1933)
- Helictophanes dryocoma (Meyrick, 1916)
- Homona coffearia (Nietner, 1861)
- Isodemis illiberalis (Meyrick, 1918)
- Laspeyresia anticipans (Meyrick, 1927)
- Laspeyresia ethelinda (Meyrick, 1934)
- Laspeyresia jaculatrix (Meyrick, 1910)
- Laspeyresia lucida (Meyrick, 1916)
- Laspeyresia malesana (Meyrick, 1920)
- Laspeyresia pycnochra (Meyrick, 1920)
- Laspeyresia staphiditis (Meyrick, 1930)
- Laspeyresia stirpicola (Meyrick, 1926)
- Laspeyresia xerophila (Meyrick, 1939)
- Lobesia serangodes (Meyrick, 1920)
- Meridemis insulata (Meyrick, 1908)
- Olethreutes exsignata (Meyrick, 1916)
- Olethreutes halantha (Meyrick, 1909)
- Olethreutes hoplista (Meyrick, 1927)
- Olethreutes miltographa (Meyrick, 1907)
- Olethreutes mniochlora (Meyrick, 1907)
- Olethreutes pertexta (Meyrick, 1920)
- Olethreutes phyllochlora (Meyrick, 1905)
- Olethreutes poetica (Meyrick, 1909)
- Olethreutes scolopendrias (Meyrick, 1912)
- Pammene theristis (Meyrick, 1912)
- Peronea divisana (Walker)
- Phaeeasiophora pertexta (Meyrick, 1920)
- Proschistis lucifera (Meyrick, 1909)
- Pternozyga haeretica (Meyrick, 1908)
- Scoliographa hoplista (Meyrick, 1927)
- Sorolopha camarotis (Meyrick, 1936)
- Spilonota babylonica (Meyrick, 1912)
- Spilonota hexametra (Meyrick, 1920)
- Strepsicrates dilacerata (Meyrick, 1928)
- Terthreutis bulligera (Meyrick, 1928)
- Ulodemis falsa (Meyrick, 1914)
- Ulodemis trigrapha (Meyrick, 1907)
