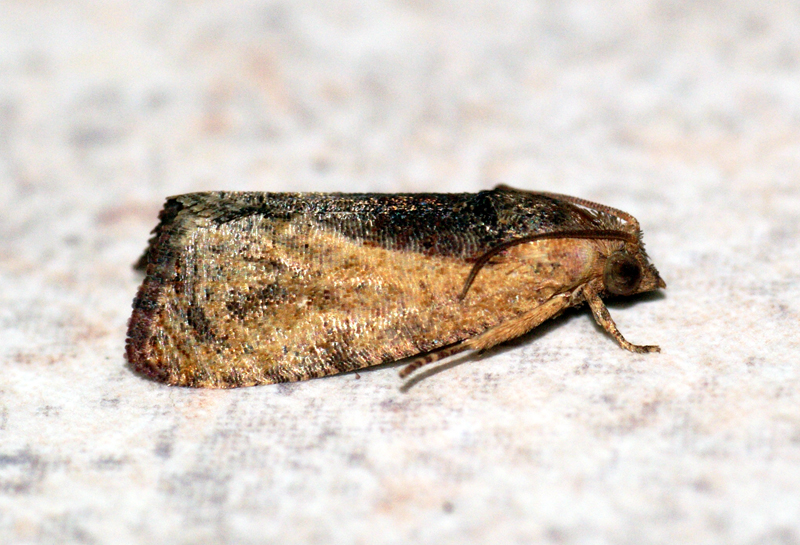

Scientific classification
- Kingdom: Animalia
- Phylum: Arthropoda
- Class: Insecta
- Order: Lepidoptera
- Family: Tortricidae
- Genus: Cryptophlebia
- Species: C. ombrodelta

Binomial name
- Cryptophlebia ombrodelta (Lower, 1898)

Synonyms
- Arotrophora ombrodelta Lower, 1898; Cryptophlebia carpophaga Walsingham, 1900; Argyroploce illepida Meyrick, 1911; Argyroploce lasiandra Meyrick, 1909

= Cryptophlebia ombrodelta =

Species of moth

Cryptophlebia ombrodelta, the litchi fruit moth or macadamia nut borer, is a moth of the family Tortricidae. The species was first described by Oswald Bertram Lower in 1898. It is native to India, Sri Lanka, Nepal, Indonesia, China, Taiwan, Vietnam, Thailand, western Malaysia, New Guinea, the Philippines, Japan, Guam, the Caroline Islands, Australia and has been introduced to Hawaii.

== Description ==
The wingspan is 15–22 mm. Forewings brownish to reddish brown. A dark-brown pre-tornal spot is distinctive in females, but faded in males. Males possess sex scales on the hindwing, hind tibia, and abdomen. Females with a costal fold on forewings, which is absent in males.

Eggs are white, round and flat, and laid in small groups of 15 on the fruit. Late instars are 13–20 mm long. The abdomen of the caterpillar is yellowish white. In the final instar, its color turns to red. Pinacula large and darker than body. Head and prothoracic shield blackish to dark brown in early instars which turns pale to yellowish brown in final instars. Anal comb rudimentary with 4-6 small teeth. Pupa yellow brown.

== Pest attack ==
It is considered a pest of legumes.

The larvae are a minor polyphagous pest and feeds on a wide range of plants.

=== Larval host plants ===
- Acacia sp.
- Acacia farnesiana
- Acacia nilotica
- Adenanthera pavonina
- Aegle marmelos
- Averrhoa carambola
- Bauhinia hirsuta
- Bauhinia malabarica
- Bauhinia purpurea
- Buckinghamia celsissima
- Caesalpinia decapetala
- Caesalpinia pulcherrima
- Caesalpinia sappan
- Cassia fistula
- Cassia occidentalis
- Cassia alata
- Cassia sophera
- Cassia bicapsularis
- Citrus sp.
- Coccoloba uvifera
- Cocos nucifera
- Cupaniopsis anacardioides
- Delonix regia
- Dimocarpus longan
- Feronia sp.
- Filicium decipiens
- Glycine max
- Indigofera suffruticosa
- Limonia acidissima
- Litchi chinensis
- Macadamia sp.
- Nephelium litchi
- Nephelium lappaceum
- Parkia sp.
- Parkinsonia aculeata
- Phaseolus lunatus
- Phaseolus vulgaris
- Pithecellobium dulce.
- Poinciana pulcherrima
- Prosopis juliflora
- Prosopis pallida
- Senna alata
- Senna bicapsularis
- Senna occidentalis
- Senna septemtrionalis
- Senna sophera
- Sesbania aculeata
- Sesbania bispinosa
- Sesbania grandiflora
- Tamarindus indica

== Control ==
Adult moths can be eradicated by mechanical methods such as hand picking and trapping. Passive trapping methods such as emergence traps, flight traps, malaise traps and sticky traps are ineffective. Bait traps are also found ineffective to catch adults. Light traps, suction traps and pheromone traps are effective. It is also found that the Robinson light trap attracted more males than females.

Parasitoids such as Trichogramma cryptophlebiae, Brachymeria pomonae, Gotro bimaculata and Bracon species can be used to destroy eggs and caterpillars.

Other methods such as mating disruption, hot water treatments, irradiation and usage of insecticides can also be used.
