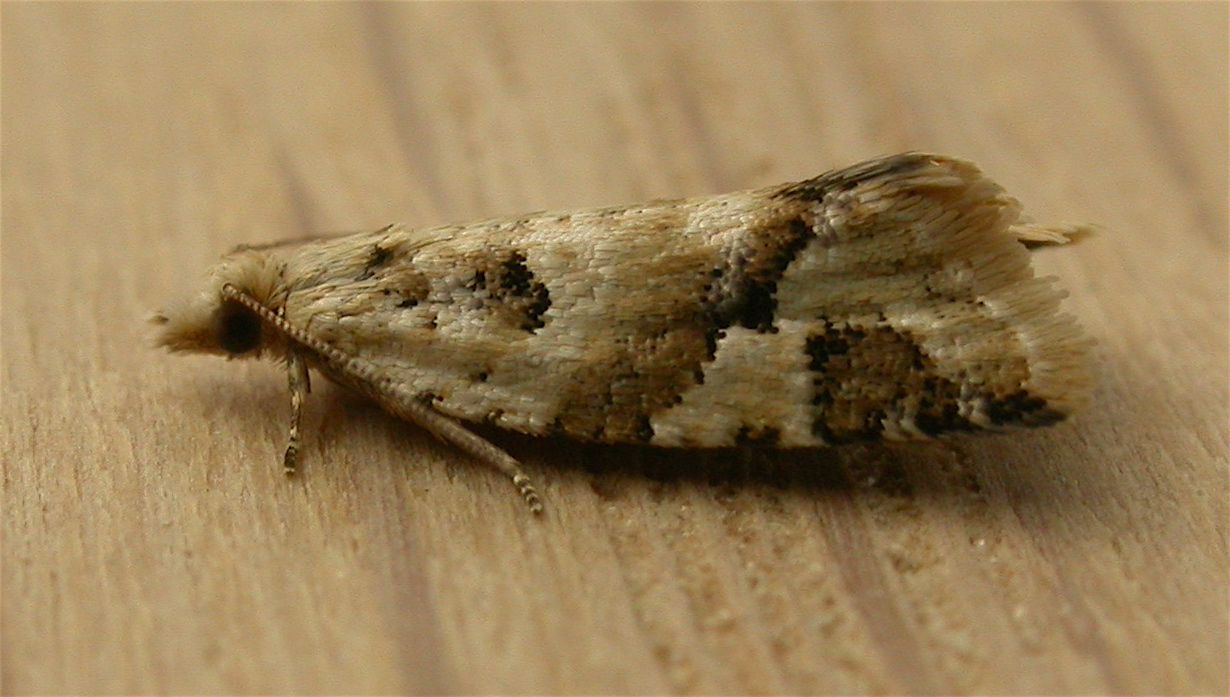
- Capua euphona

Scientific classification
- Domain: Eukaryota
- Kingdom: Animalia
- Phylum: Arthropoda
- Class: Insecta
- Order: Lepidoptera
- Family: Tortricidae
- Subfamily: Tortricinae
- Tribe: Archipini
- Genus: Capua; Stephens, 1834

Synonyms
- Cupua Kawabe, 1989; Teratodes Guenée, 1845 (preocc.)

= Capua (moth) =

Genus of tortrix moths

Capua is a genus of moths belonging to the subfamily Tortricinae of the family Tortricidae.

== Species ==
- Capua aeluropa Meyrick, 1926
- Capua arctophaea Meyrick, 1924
- Capua aridela Turner, 1918
- Capua changi Kawabe, 1989
- Capua chloraspis Meyrick, 1924
- Capua cirrhanthes Meyrick, 1921
- Capua coenotoca Diakonoff, 1983
- Capua cornigera Meyrick, 1912
- Capua endocypha Meyrick, 1931
- Capua euphona Meyrick, 1910
- Capua fabrilis Meyrick, 1912
- Capua liparochra Meyrick, 1928
- Capua lissochrysa Diakonoff, 1976
- Capua morosa Diakonoff, 1975
- Capua oxycelis Diakonoff, 1983
- Capua pantherina (Meyrick, 1908)
- Capua reclina Razowski, 1978
- Capua repentina Razowski, 1978
- Capua retractana (Walker, 1863)
- Capua semiferana (Walker, 1863)
- Capua spilonoma Meyrick, 1932
- Capua thelmae Diakonoff, 1968
- Capua vulgana (Frolich, 1828)
- Capua zapyrrha Meyrick, 1936

== See also ==
- List of Tortricidae genera
