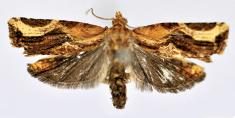
- Male
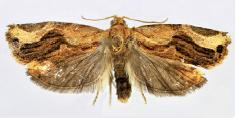
- Female

Scientific classification
- Kingdom: Animalia
- Phylum: Arthropoda
- Clade: Pancrustacea
- Class: Insecta
- Order: Lepidoptera
- Family: Tortricidae
- Genus: Isodemis
- Species: I. stenotera

Binomial name
- Isodemis stenotera Diakonoff, 1983

= Isodemis stenotera =

Species of moth

Isodemis stenotera is a moth of the family Tortricidae. It is found in China (Hunan, Guangxi, Hainan, Tibet, Yunnan) and Indonesia (Sumatra).

== Taxonomy ==
The species was described by Alexey Diakonoff in 1983 from a male specimen collected at Fort de Kock (now Bukittinggi) in West Sumatra. The holotype is held at the Rijksmuseum van Natuurlijke Historie in Leiden. It belongs to the tribe Archipini in the subfamily Tortricinae. The female was first described in 2011, from Chinese specimens.

== Description ==
The wingspan is 17.5–22 mm for males and 19–27 mm for females. The head, antennae and labial palps are yellow, scattered with ochreous. The thorax and tegulae are ochreous brown tinged with yellow.

The forewing is broad and nearly rectangular, with a slightly protruding apex. The ground colour is yellow, with scattered pale ochreous scales in the middle and dense ochreous-brown scales along the dorsal area. The markings are ochreous brown with sparse brownish-black scales. The costal margin has two dots near the base and a triangular spot. The median fascia is broken or faint in the middle. A faint, pale ochreous-yellow stripe runs from below the costal part of the median fascia to the termen below the apex, narrowing as it goes. A narrow, stripe-shaped subapical blotch runs from the middle of the costal margin to before the apex, with brownish-black and yellow dots along the costa. The cilia are ochreous mixed with brownish black, but yellow at the apex.

The hindwings are pale greyish brown, with a large yellow patch towards the tip tinged with sparse pale ochreous-brown scales. Their cilia are pale greyish brown. The legs are pale yellow, with brownish black on the underside of the foreleg. The outer side of the mid- and hindlegs is yellow tinged with brownish black. The abdomen is greyish brown.

Some males have a small brownish-yellow spot on the median fascia near the termen, joined to the yellow stripe above it.

=== Similar species ===
The species looks very similar to the type species of the genus, Isodemis serpentinana, both outwardly and in the genitalia. The two can be told apart by details of the male and female genitalia.
