= Orange moth =

Orange moth is a common name for several species of moths and may refer to:

- Angerona prunaria
- Thaumatotibia leucotreta, also known as false codling moth, citrus codling moth, or orange codling moth
- Triodia sylvina, also known as orange swift
