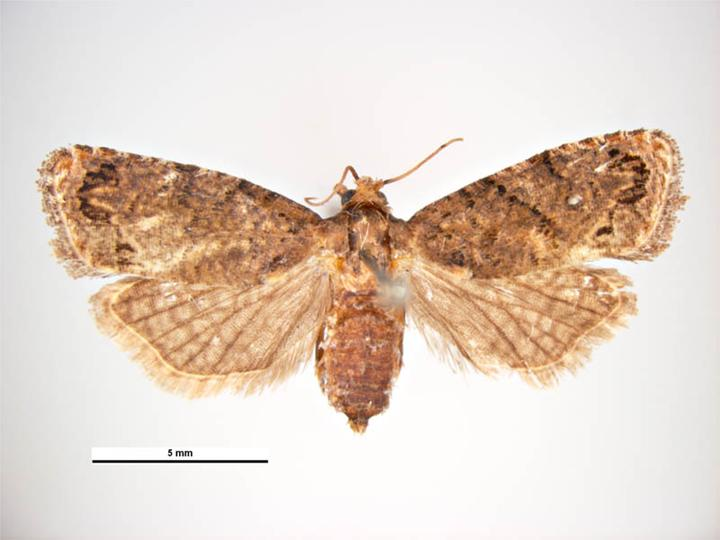
- Female false codling moth, T. leucotreta

Scientific classification
- Kingdom: Animalia
- Phylum: Arthropoda
- Class: Insecta
- Order: Lepidoptera
- Family: Tortricidae
- Tribe: Grapholitini
- Genus: Thaumatotibia; Zacher, 1915

Synonyms
- Metriophlebia Diakonoff, 1969

= Thaumatotibia =

Genus of tortrix moths

Thaumatotibia is a genus of moths belonging to the family Tortricidae.

Some species have been moved here from other genera, such as Cryptophlebia or Eucosma.

== Species ==
- Thaumatotibia aclyta (Turner, 1916)
- Thaumatotibia agriochlora (Meyrick, 1929)
- Thaumatotibia apicinudana (Mabille, 1900)
- Thaumatotibia batrachopa (Meyrick, 1908)
- Thaumatotibia chaomorpha (Meyrick, 1929)
- Thaumatotibia citrogramma (Clarke, 1976)
- Thaumatotibia dolichogonia (Diakonoff, 1988)
- Thaumatotibia ecnomia (Diakonoff, 1974)
- Thaumatotibia encarpa (Meyrick, 1920)
- Thaumatotibia etiennei (Diakonoff, 1974)
- Thaumatotibia eutacta (Diakonoff, 1988)
- Thaumatotibia fulturana (Kuznetzov, 1992)
- Thaumatotibia hemitoma (Diakonoff, 1976)
- Thaumatotibia leucotreta (Meyrick, 1913)
- Thaumatotibia macrogona (Diakonoff, 1988)
- Thaumatotibia macrops (Diakonoff, 1959)
- Thaumatotibia nannophthalma (Diakonoff, 1976)
- Thaumatotibia nythobia (Clarke, 1971)
- Thaumatotibia rassembi Bippus, 2020
- Thaumatotibia rochata Bippus, 2020
- Thaumatotibia zophophanes (Turner, 1946)

== See also ==
- List of Tortricidae genera
