= Terthreutis jingae =

Scientific classification
- Domain: Eukaryota
- Kingdom: Animalia
- Phylum: Arthropoda
- Class: Insecta
- Order: Lepidoptera
- Family: Tortricidae
- Genus: Terthreutis
- Species: T. jingae

Binomial name
- Terthreutis jingae Buchsbaum & M.Y. Chen, 2013

Species of moth

Terthreutis jingae is a species of moth of the family Tortricidae. It is found in Taiwan.
