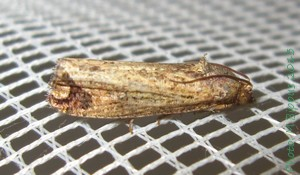

Scientific classification
- Kingdom: Animalia
- Phylum: Arthropoda
- Clade: Pancrustacea
- Class: Insecta
- Order: Lepidoptera
- Family: Tortricidae
- Genus: Cryptophlebia
- Species: C. semilunana

Binomial name
- Cryptophlebia semilunana (Saalmüller, 1880)

Synonyms
- Carpocapsa semilunana Saalmüller, 1880; Argyroploce praesiliens Meyrick, 1924; Argyroploce xylodelta Meyrick, 1928

= Cryptophlebia semilunana =

Species of moth

Cryptophlebia semilunana is a moth of the family Tortricidae. It is found in Africa, where it is known from Kenya, Uganda, Tanzania, South Africa, Madagascar, Réunion and Mauritius.

Host plants of the larvae of this species are Fabaceae (Sesbania sp.)
