= Meridemis validana =

Scientific classification
- Kingdom: Animalia
- Phylum: Arthropoda
- Class: Insecta
- Order: Lepidoptera
- Family: Tortricidae
- Genus: Meridemis
- Species: M. validana

Binomial name
- Meridemis validana Razowski, 2008

Species of moth

Meridemis validana is a species of moth of the family Tortricidae. It is found in Vietnam.

The wingspan is 13 mm for males and 19 mm for females.

== Etymology ==
The species name refers to female genitalia and is derived from Latin validana (meaning strong).
