= Scotiophyes nebrias =

Scientific classification
- Domain: Eukaryota
- Kingdom: Animalia
- Phylum: Arthropoda
- Class: Insecta
- Order: Lepidoptera
- Family: Tortricidae
- Genus: Scotiophyes
- Species: S. nebrias

Binomial name
- Scotiophyes nebrias Diakonoff, 1984

Species of moth

Scotiophyes nebrias is a species of moth of the family Tortricidae. It is found in Brunei on the island of Borneo.
