= Meridemis detractana =

Scientific classification
- Kingdom: Animalia
- Phylum: Arthropoda
- Class: Insecta
- Order: Lepidoptera
- Family: Tortricidae
- Genus: Meridemis
- Species: M. detractana

Binomial name
- Meridemis detractana (Walker, 1863)

Synonyms
- Tortrix detractana Walker, 1863

Species of moth

Meridemis detractana is a species of moth of the family Tortricidae first described by Francis Walker in 1863. It is found in Sri Lanka.

Its larval host plants are Lantana species.
