= Ulodemis idjen =

Scientific classification
- Kingdom: Animalia
- Phylum: Arthropoda
- Class: Insecta
- Order: Lepidoptera
- Family: Tortricidae
- Genus: Ulodemis
- Species: U. idjen

Binomial name
- Ulodemis idjen Diakonoff, 1941

Species of moth

Ulodemis idjen is a species of moth of the family Tortricidae. It is found on Java in Indonesia.
