= Capua oxycelis =

Scientific classification
- Domain: Eukaryota
- Kingdom: Animalia
- Phylum: Arthropoda
- Class: Insecta
- Order: Lepidoptera
- Family: Tortricidae
- Genus: Capua
- Species: C. oxycelis

Binomial name
- Capua oxycelis Diakonoff, 1983

Species of moth

Capua oxycelis is a species of moth of the family Tortricidae. It is found on Sumatra in Indonesia.
