= Isodemis phloiosignum =

Scientific classification
- Kingdom: Animalia
- Phylum: Arthropoda
- Class: Insecta
- Order: Lepidoptera
- Family: Tortricidae
- Genus: Isodemis
- Species: I. phloiosignum

Binomial name
- Isodemis phloiosignum Razowski, 2013

Species of moth

Isodemis phloiosignum is a species of moth of the family Tortricidae first described by Józef Razowski in 2013. It is found on Seram Island, Indonesia.

The wingspan is about 26 mm.
