= Ulodemis hyalura =

Scientific classification
- Domain: Eukaryota
- Kingdom: Animalia
- Phylum: Arthropoda
- Class: Insecta
- Order: Lepidoptera
- Family: Tortricidae
- Genus: Ulodemis
- Species: U. hyalura

Binomial name
- Ulodemis hyalura Diakonoff, 1983

Species of moth

Ulodemis hyalura is a species of moth of the family Tortricidae. It is found in Vietnam, Malaysia and Indonesia (Sumatra, Java).

The wingspan is 22–24 mm.

The larvae feed on Camellia sinensis.
