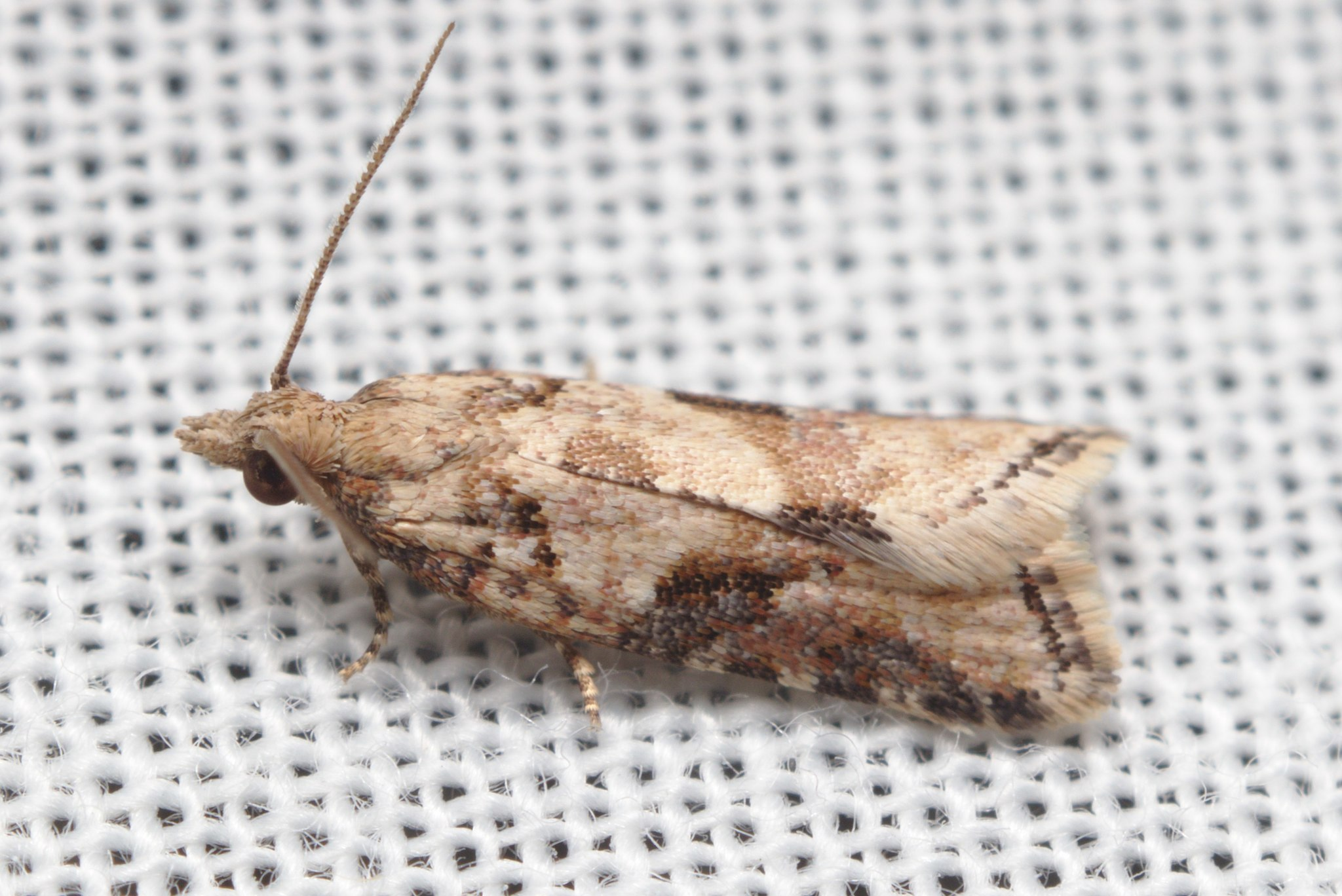

Scientific classification
- Kingdom: Animalia
- Phylum: Arthropoda
- Clade: Pancrustacea
- Class: Insecta
- Order: Lepidoptera
- Family: Tortricidae
- Genus: Capua
- Species: C. semiferana

Binomial name
- Capua semiferana (Walker, 1863)

Synonyms
- Teras semiferana Walker, 1863; Pyrgotis semiferana (Walker, 1863); Grapholita abnegatana Walker, 1864; Tinea admotella Walker, 1863; Sciaphila detritana Walker, 1863; Capua polias Meyrick, 1913

= Capua semiferana =

Species of moth

Capua semiferana is a species of moth of the family Tortricidae. It is endemic to New Zealand. This species was first described by Francis Walker in 1863.

== Taxonomy ==
This species was described by Francis Walker in 1863 and originally named Teras semiferana. The female holotype, collected by D. Bolton in Auckland, is held at the Natural History Museum, London. George Hudson discussed and illustrated this species under the name Capua semiferana in his 1928 book The butterflies and moths of New Zealand. The genus placement of this species is in need of revision.

== Description ==
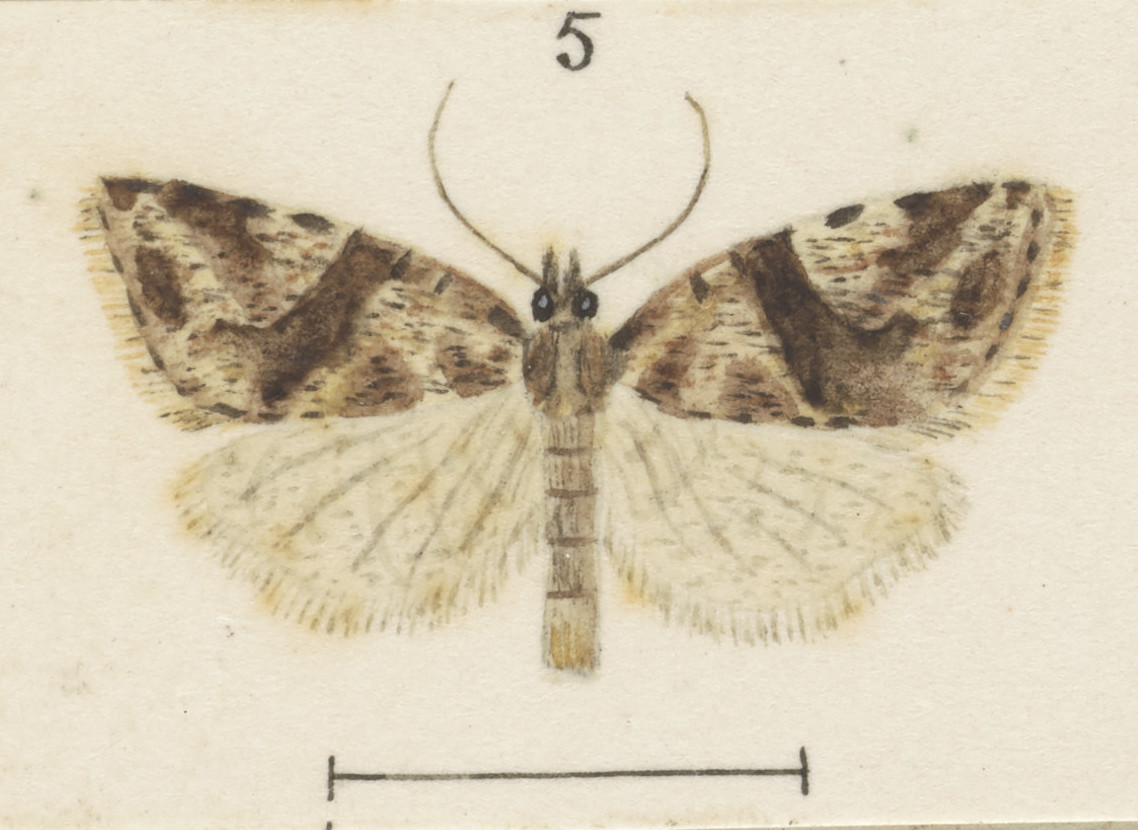
Illustration of C. semiferana by George Hudson.

Hudson described this species as follows:

The expansion of the wings varies from slightly under to slightly over 5/8 inch. The fore-wings, which are somewhat dilated in the male, vary from pale greyish-ochreous to light reddish-brown; there is a series of minute black marks on the costa and dorsum; an irregular brownish patch near the base, often outwardly margined with black; a more or less distinct central band often obsolete towards the dorsum, brown, usually much darker or blackish on the costa and in some specimens represented by a large elliptical, blackish marking on the costa with a pale grey centre; there is usually a small brown mark near the termen; the cilia are ochreous or pale reddish-ochreous, much paler near the tornus. The hind-wings are grey faintly mottled with darker grey; the cilia are pale grey.

Hudson commented that this species is very variable in size, colour and intensity of markings.

== Distribution ==
This species is endemic to New Zealand and is found throughout the country.

== Behaviour ==
Although Hudson observed this species flying freely in late afternoon sunlight, adults are also attracted to light at night.
