= Meridemis obraztsovi =

Scientific classification
- Domain: Eukaryota
- Kingdom: Animalia
- Phylum: Arthropoda
- Class: Insecta
- Order: Lepidoptera
- Family: Tortricidae
- Genus: Meridemis
- Species: M. obraztsovi

Binomial name
- Meridemis obraztsovi Rose & Pooni, 2004

Species of moth

Meridemis obraztsovi is a species of moth of the family Tortricidae. It is found in north-western India.
