= Capua fabrilis =

Scientific classification
- Kingdom: Animalia
- Phylum: Arthropoda
- Class: Insecta
- Order: Lepidoptera
- Family: Tortricidae
- Genus: Capua
- Species: C. fabrilis

Binomial name
- Capua fabrilis Meyrick, 1912

Species of moth

Capua fabrilis is a species of moth of the family Tortricidae. It is found in the Philippines on Luzon island.
