= Meridemis =

Scientific classification
- Domain: Eukaryota
- Kingdom: Animalia
- Phylum: Arthropoda
- Class: Insecta
- Order: Lepidoptera
- Family: Tortricidae
- Subfamily: Tortricinae
- Genus: Meridemis; Diakonoff, 1976

Genus of tortrix moths

Meridemis is a genus of moths belonging to the subfamily Tortricinae of the family Tortricidae.

== Species ==
- Meridemis bathymorpha Diakonoff, 1976
- Meridemis detractana (Walker, 1863)
- Meridemis furtiva Diakonoff, 1976
- Meridemis hylaeana (Ghesquière, 1940)
- Meridemis insulata (Meyrick, 1908)
- Meridemis invalidana (Walker, 1863)
- Meridemis obraztsovi Rose & Pooni, 2004
- Meridemis punjabensis Rose & Pooni, 2004
- Meridemis subbathymorpha Razowski, 2006
- Meridemis validana Razowski, 2008
- Meridemis vietorum Razowski, 1989

== See also ==
- List of Tortricidae genera
