= Capua zapyrrha =

Scientific classification
- Kingdom: Animalia
- Phylum: Arthropoda
- Class: Insecta
- Order: Lepidoptera
- Family: Tortricidae
- Genus: Capua
- Species: C. zapyrrha

Binomial name
- Capua zapyrrha Meyrick, 1936

Species of moth

Capua zapyrrha is a species of moth of the family Tortricidae. It is found on Samoa in the south-western Pacific Ocean.
