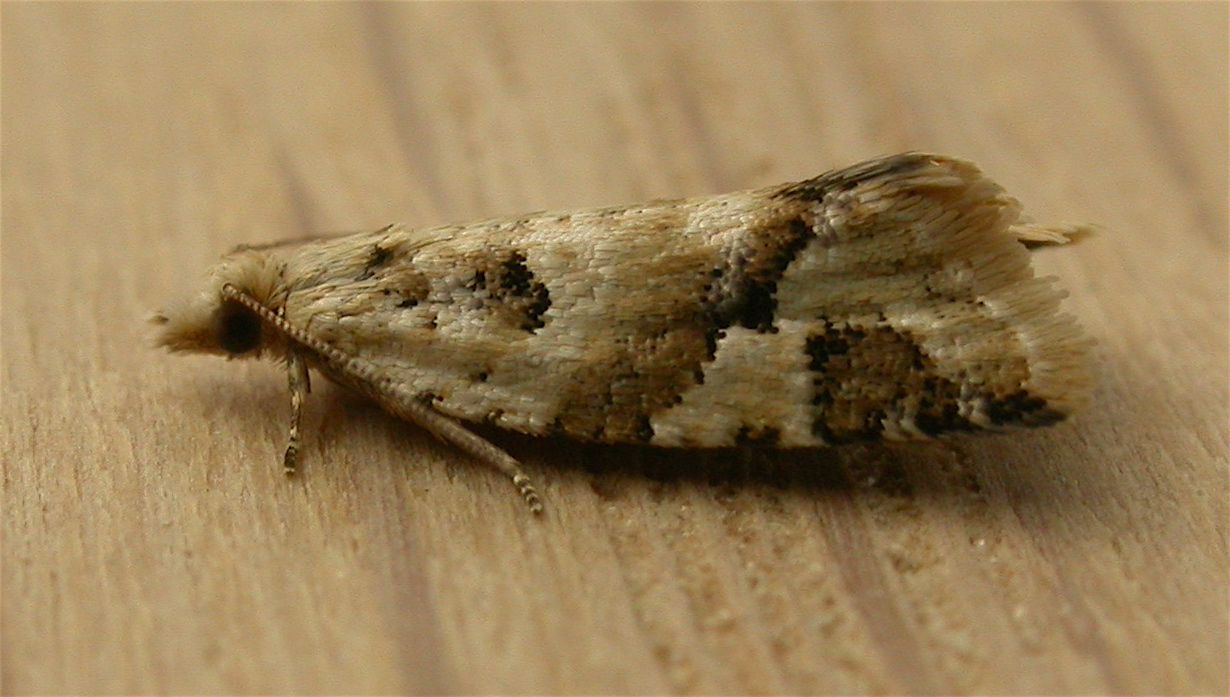

Scientific classification
- Kingdom: Animalia
- Phylum: Arthropoda
- Class: Insecta
- Order: Lepidoptera
- Family: Tortricidae
- Genus: Capua
- Species: C. euphona

Binomial name
- Capua euphona Meyrick, 1910

= Capua euphona =

Species of moth

Capua euphona is a species of moth of the family Tortricidae. It is found in Australia.
