= Cryptophlebia omphala =

Scientific classification
- Kingdom: Animalia
- Phylum: Arthropoda
- Class: Insecta
- Order: Lepidoptera
- Family: Tortricidae
- Genus: Cryptophlebia
- Species: C. omphala

Binomial name
- Cryptophlebia omphala Razowski, 2013

Species of moth

Cryptophlebia omphala is a species of moth of the family Tortricidae. It is found in New Caledonia. The habitat consists of rainforests and planted forests.

The wingspan is about 23 mm.
