= Pternozyga =

Scientific classification
- Kingdom: Animalia
- Phylum: Arthropoda
- Class: Insecta
- Order: Lepidoptera
- Family: Tortricidae
- Tribe: Archipini
- Genus: Pternozyga; Meyrick, 1908

Genus of tortrix moths

Pternozyga is a genus of moths belonging to the subfamily Tortricinae of the family Tortricidae.

== Species ==
- Pternozyga anisoptera Diakonoff, 1941
- Pternozyga argodoxa Meyrick, 1922
- Pternozyga haeretica Meyrick, 1908
- Pternozyga melanoterma Diakonoff, 1953

== See also ==
- List of Tortricidae genera
