= Terthreutis argentea =

Scientific classification
- Domain: Eukaryota
- Kingdom: Animalia
- Phylum: Arthropoda
- Class: Insecta
- Order: Lepidoptera
- Family: Tortricidae
- Genus: Terthreutis
- Species: T. argentea

Binomial name
- Terthreutis argentea (Butler, 1886)

Synonyms
- Ichthyura argentea Butler, 1886

Species of moth

Terthreutis argentea is a species of moth of the family Tortricidae. It is found in India (West Bengal, Sikkim).

The wingspan is 16–21 mm. Adults have been recorded on wing in October.
