= Cryptophlebia amblyopa =

Scientific classification
- Kingdom: Animalia
- Phylum: Arthropoda
- Class: Insecta
- Order: Lepidoptera
- Family: Tortricidae
- Genus: Cryptophlebia
- Species: C. amblyopa

Binomial name
- Cryptophlebia amblyopa Clarke, 1976

Species of moth

Cryptophlebia amblyopa is a species of moth of the family Tortricidae. It is found in Micronesia (Palau Island) and New Caledonia. The habitat consists of rainforests.
