= Pternozyga melanoterma =

Scientific classification
- Domain: Eukaryota
- Kingdom: Animalia
- Phylum: Arthropoda
- Class: Insecta
- Order: Lepidoptera
- Family: Tortricidae
- Genus: Pternozyga
- Species: P. melanoterma

Binomial name
- Pternozyga melanoterma Diakonoff, 1953

Species of moth

Pternozyga melanoterma is a species of moth of the family Tortricidae. It is found on New Guinea.
