= Capua morosa =

Scientific classification
- Domain: Eukaryota
- Kingdom: Animalia
- Phylum: Arthropoda
- Class: Insecta
- Order: Lepidoptera
- Family: Tortricidae
- Genus: Capua
- Species: C. morosa

Binomial name
- Capua morosa Diakonoff, 1975

Species of moth

Capua morosa is a species of moth of the family Tortricidae. It is found on Java in Indonesia.
