= Scotiophyes hemiptycha =

Scientific classification
- Domain: Eukaryota
- Kingdom: Animalia
- Phylum: Arthropoda
- Class: Insecta
- Order: Lepidoptera
- Family: Tortricidae
- Genus: Scotiophyes
- Species: S. hemiptycha

Binomial name
- Scotiophyes hemiptycha Diakonoff, 1983

Species of moth

Scotiophyes hemiptycha is a species of moth of the family Tortricidae. It is found on Sumatra in Indonesia.
