= Meridemis hylaeana =

Scientific classification
- Kingdom: Animalia
- Phylum: Arthropoda
- Class: Insecta
- Order: Lepidoptera
- Family: Tortricidae
- Genus: Meridemis
- Species: M. hylaeana

Binomial name
- Meridemis hylaeana (Ghesquière, 1940)

Synonyms
- Homona hylaeana Ghesquière, 1940

Species of moth

Meridemis hylaeana is a species of moth of the family Tortricidae. It is found in the Democratic Republic of Congo.
