= Capua endocypha =

Scientific classification
- Kingdom: Animalia
- Phylum: Arthropoda
- Class: Insecta
- Order: Lepidoptera
- Family: Tortricidae
- Genus: Capua
- Species: C. endocypha

Binomial name
- Capua endocypha Meyrick, 1931

Species of moth

Capua endocypha is a moth of the family Tortricidae. It was described by Edward Meyrick in 1931. It is found on Fiji and in Singapore.

The wingspan is about 24 mm.

The larvae feed on Rhizophoraceae species.
