= Terthreutis duosticta =

Scientific classification
- Domain: Eukaryota
- Kingdom: Animalia
- Phylum: Arthropoda
- Class: Insecta
- Order: Lepidoptera
- Family: Tortricidae
- Genus: Terthreutis
- Species: T. duosticta

Binomial name
- Terthreutis duosticta Wileman & Stringer, 1929

Species of moth

Terthreutis duosticta is a species of moth of the family Tortricidae. It is found in Taiwan.

The wingspan is about 17 mm.
