= Isodemis brevicera =

Scientific classification
- Domain: Eukaryota
- Kingdom: Animalia
- Phylum: Arthropoda
- Class: Insecta
- Order: Lepidoptera
- Family: Tortricidae
- Genus: Isodemis
- Species: I. brevicera

Binomial name
- Isodemis brevicera Razowski, 2009

Species of moth

Isodemis brevicera is a moth of the family Tortricidae. It is found in Vietnam.

The wingspan is 21 mm.

== Etymology ==
The name is derived from Latin brevis (meaning short) and cera, from Greek keras (meaning a horn).
