= Chirapsina =

Scientific classification
- Kingdom: Animalia
- Phylum: Arthropoda
- Class: Insecta
- Order: Lepidoptera
- Family: Tortricidae
- Tribe: Archipini
- Genus: Chirapsina; Razowski, 2009

Genus of moths

Chirapsina is a genus of moths belonging to the subfamily Tortricinae of the family Tortricidae.

== Species ==
- Chirapsina hemixantha (Meyrick, 1918)
- Chirapsina expleta (Meyrick, 1923)

== See also ==
- List of Tortricidae genera
