= Capua thelmae =

Scientific classification
- Domain: Eukaryota
- Kingdom: Animalia
- Phylum: Arthropoda
- Class: Insecta
- Order: Lepidoptera
- Family: Tortricidae
- Genus: Capua
- Species: C. thelmae

Binomial name
- Capua thelmae Diakonoff, 1968

Species of moth

Capua thelmae is a species of moth of the family Tortricidae. It is found on Mindanao island in the Philippines.
