= Ulodemis pangerango =

Scientific classification
- Domain: Eukaryota
- Kingdom: Animalia
- Phylum: Arthropoda
- Class: Insecta
- Order: Lepidoptera
- Family: Tortricidae
- Genus: Ulodemis
- Species: U. pangerango

Binomial name
- Ulodemis pangerango Diakonoff, 1941

Species of moth

Ulodemis pangerango is a species of moth of the family Tortricidae. It is found on Java in Indonesia.
