= Capua lissochrysa =

Scientific classification
- Kingdom: Animalia
- Phylum: Arthropoda
- Clade: Pancrustacea
- Class: Insecta
- Order: Lepidoptera
- Family: Tortricidae
- Genus: Capua
- Species: C. lissochrysa

Binomial name
- Capua lissochrysa Diakonoff, 1976

Species of moth

Capua lissochrysa is a species of moth of the family Tortricidae. It is found in Nepal.
