= Scotiophyes =

Scientific classification
- Kingdom: Animalia
- Phylum: Arthropoda
- Clade: Pancrustacea
- Class: Insecta
- Order: Lepidoptera
- Family: Tortricidae
- Tribe: Archipini
- Genus: Scotiophyes; Diakonoff, 1976

Genus of tortrix moths

Scotiophyes is a genus of moths belonging to the subfamily Tortricinae of the family Tortricidae.

== Species ==
- Scotiophyes faeculosa (Meyrick, 1928)
- Scotiophyes hemiptycha Diakonoff, 1983
- Scotiophyes nebrias Diakonoff, 1984
- Scotiophyes subtriangulata Wang, 2009

== See also ==
- List of Tortricidae genera
