= Cryptophlebia heterospina =

Scientific classification
- Kingdom: Animalia
- Phylum: Arthropoda
- Class: Insecta
- Order: Lepidoptera
- Family: Tortricidae
- Genus: Cryptophlebia
- Species: C. heterospina

Binomial name
- Cryptophlebia heterospina Razowski, 2013

Species of moth

Cryptophlebia heterospina is a species of moth of the family Tortricidae first described by Józef Razowski in . It is found on Seram Island in Indonesia. The habitat consists of bamboo and secondary forests.

The wingspan is about 24 mm.
