= Cryptophlebia rhynchias =

Scientific classification
- Kingdom: Animalia
- Phylum: Arthropoda
- Class: Insecta
- Order: Lepidoptera
- Family: Tortricidae
- Genus: Cryptophlebia
- Species: C. rhynchias

Binomial name
- Cryptophlebia rhynchias (Meyrick, 1905)

Synonyms
- Platypeplus rhynchias Meyrick, 1905; Argyroploce rynchias Ghesquière, 1940

Species of moth

Cryptophlebia rhynchias is a species of moth of the family Tortricidae first described by Edward Meyrick in 1905. It is found from Mauritius, India, Sri Lanka, the southern Mariana Islands, the New Hebrides, Fiji, Samoa, Sudest Island, the Society Islands, the Austral Islands and the Marquesas Islands to Australia. The habitat consists of bamboo and secondary forests.
