= Meridemis vietorum =

Scientific classification
- Kingdom: Animalia
- Phylum: Arthropoda
- Class: Insecta
- Order: Lepidoptera
- Family: Tortricidae
- Genus: Meridemis
- Species: M. vietorum

Binomial name
- Meridemis vietorum Razowski, 1989

Species of moth

Meridemis vietorum is a species of moth of the family Tortricidae. It is found in northern Vietnam and Korea.
