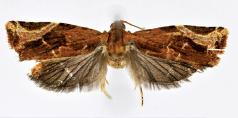

Scientific classification
- Domain: Eukaryota
- Kingdom: Animalia
- Phylum: Arthropoda
- Class: Insecta
- Order: Lepidoptera
- Family: Tortricidae
- Genus: Isodemis
- Species: I. proxima

Binomial name
- Isodemis proxima Razowski, 2000

= Isodemis proxima =

Species of moth

Isodemis proxima is a moth of the family Tortricidae. It is known from China (in the provinces of Guangdong, Guangxi and Hainan) and in Taiwan.

The wingspan is 16–21 millimetres (0.63–0.83 in). Adults are on wing in late March, mid-April and mid-May.
