= Capua aeluropa =

Scientific classification
- Kingdom: Animalia
- Phylum: Arthropoda
- Class: Insecta
- Order: Lepidoptera
- Family: Tortricidae
- Genus: Capua
- Species: C. aeluropa

Binomial name
- Capua aeluropa Meyrick, 1926

Species of moth

Capua aeluropa is a species of moth of the family Tortricidae. It is found on Borneo and in New Guinea.
