= Capua cirrhanthes =

Scientific classification
- Kingdom: Animalia
- Phylum: Arthropoda
- Class: Insecta
- Order: Lepidoptera
- Family: Tortricidae
- Genus: Capua
- Species: C. cirrhanthes

Binomial name
- Capua cirrhanthes Meyrick, 1921

Species of moth

Capua cirrhanthes is a species of moth of the family Tortricidae. It is found on Sulawesi in Indonesia.
