= Terthreutis series =

Scientific classification
- Domain: Eukaryota
- Kingdom: Animalia
- Phylum: Arthropoda
- Class: Insecta
- Order: Lepidoptera
- Family: Tortricidae
- Genus: Terthreutis
- Species: T. series

Binomial name
- Terthreutis series Bai, 1993

Synonyms
- Terthreutis seris Bai, 1993

Species of moth

Terthreutis series is a species of moth of the family Tortricidae. It is found in Sichuan, China.
