= Meridemis bathymorpha =

Scientific classification
- Domain: Eukaryota
- Kingdom: Animalia
- Phylum: Arthropoda
- Class: Insecta
- Order: Lepidoptera
- Family: Tortricidae
- Genus: Meridemis
- Species: M. bathymorpha

Binomial name
- Meridemis bathymorpha Diakonoff, 1976

Species of moth

Meridemis bathymorpha is a species of moth of the family Tortricidae. It is found in Vietnam, Thailand, Indonesia (Sumatra, Java, Bali, Sulawesi), western Malaysia, Taiwan and Nepal.

The wingspan is 13–15 mm.
