= Isodemis longicera =

Scientific classification
- Domain: Eukaryota
- Kingdom: Animalia
- Phylum: Arthropoda
- Class: Insecta
- Order: Lepidoptera
- Family: Tortricidae
- Genus: Isodemis
- Species: I. longicera

Binomial name
- Isodemis longicera Razowski, 2009

Species of moth

Isodemis longicera is a moth of the family Tortricidae. It is found in Vietnam.

The wingspan is 22 mm.
