= Capua cornigera =

Scientific classification
- Kingdom: Animalia
- Phylum: Arthropoda
- Class: Insecta
- Order: Lepidoptera
- Family: Tortricidae
- Genus: Capua
- Species: C. cornigera

Binomial name
- Capua cornigera Meyrick, 1912

Species of moth

Capua cornigera is a species of moth of the family Tortricidae. It is found in India.
