= Capua aridela =

Scientific classification
- Domain: Eukaryota
- Kingdom: Animalia
- Phylum: Arthropoda
- Class: Insecta
- Order: Lepidoptera
- Family: Tortricidae
- Genus: Capua
- Species: C. aridela

Binomial name
- Capua aridela Turner, 1918

Species of moth

Capua aridela is a species of moth of the family Tortricidae. It is found in Australia, where it has been recorded from Norfolk Island.

The wingspan is about 21 mm. The forewings are silvery-white with scanty grey irroration (speckling) and sparsely scattered pale-ochreous scales and black markings. The hindwings are whitish-grey, but somewhat darker towards the apex.
