= Meridemis furtiva =

Scientific classification
- Domain: Eukaryota
- Kingdom: Animalia
- Phylum: Arthropoda
- Class: Insecta
- Order: Lepidoptera
- Family: Tortricidae
- Genus: Meridemis
- Species: M. furtiva

Binomial name
- Meridemis furtiva Diakonoff, 1976

Species of moth

Meridemis furtiva is a species of moth of the family Tortricidae. It is found in Nepal and Vietnam.
