= Terthreutis furcata =

Scientific classification
- Domain: Eukaryota
- Kingdom: Animalia
- Phylum: Arthropoda
- Class: Insecta
- Order: Lepidoptera
- Family: Tortricidae
- Genus: Terthreutis
- Species: T. furcata

Binomial name
- Terthreutis furcata Razowski, 2008

Species of moth

Terthreutis furcata is a moth of the family Tortricidae. It is found in Vietnam.
