= Ulodemis =

Scientific classification
- Kingdom: Animalia
- Phylum: Arthropoda
- Class: Insecta
- Order: Lepidoptera
- Family: Tortricidae
- Tribe: Archipini
- Genus: Ulodemis; Meyrick, 1907

Genus of tortrix moths

Ulodemis is a genus of moths belonging to the subfamily Tortricinae of the family Tortricidae.

== Species ==
- Ulodemis hyalura Diakonoff, 1983
- Ulodemis idjen Diakonoff, 1941
- Ulodemis pangerango Diakonoff, 1941
- Ulodemis tridentata Liu & Bai, 1982
- Ulodemis trigrapha Meyrick, 1907

== See also ==
- List of Tortricidae genera
