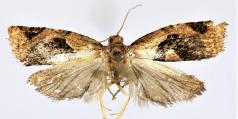
- Male
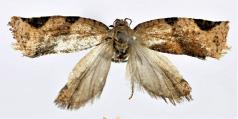
- Female

Scientific classification
- Kingdom: Animalia
- Phylum: Arthropoda
- Class: Insecta
- Order: Lepidoptera
- Family: Tortricidae
- Genus: Isodemis
- Species: I. quadrata

Binomial name
- Isodemis quadrata Sun & Li, 2011

= Isodemis quadrata =

Species of moth

Isodemis quadrata is a moth of the family Tortricidae. It is known from Tibet, China.

The wingspan is 19.5–20 mm for males and 21–22.5 mm for females.

== Male ==
The head, antenna and labial palpus are yellowish brown, with scattered ochreous brown. The thorax and tegula are ochreous brown mixed with yellowish brown. The forewing is yellowish brown with sparse ochreous scales, but the costal fold is tinged with brownish black. The markings are brownish black mottled with ochreous. The hindwings are dark gray, distally with a pale grayish brown patch tinged with yellowish brown. The cilia are dark gray. The legs are dark yellow, tinged with brownish black on the ventral side of the foreleg and on the outer side of the mid- and hindlegs. The abdomen is grayish brown.

== Female ==
The head and labial palpus are dark grayish brown. The antenna is brownish black tinged with yellowish brown. The forewings are broader than in the males. They are nearly rectangular and the apex is slightly protruding anteriorly. The costal margin is tinged with brownish black. The hindwings are gray, anterodistally with a yellowish-brown patch mottled with brownish black.

== Etymology ==
The specific name is from the Latin quadratus (meaning square), referring to the rectangular uncus in the male genitalia.
