= Capua liparochra =

Scientific classification
- Kingdom: Animalia
- Phylum: Arthropoda
- Class: Insecta
- Order: Lepidoptera
- Family: Tortricidae
- Genus: Capua
- Species: C. liparochra

Binomial name
- Capua liparochra Meyrick, 1928

Species of moth

Capua liparochra is a species of moth of the family Tortricidae. It is found in the Democratic Republic of Congo.
