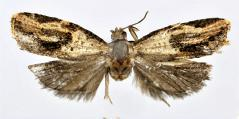
- Male
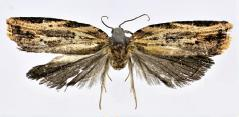
- Female

Scientific classification
- Domain: Eukaryota
- Kingdom: Animalia
- Phylum: Arthropoda
- Class: Insecta
- Order: Lepidoptera
- Family: Tortricidae
- Genus: Isodemis
- Species: I. hainanensis

Binomial name
- Isodemis hainanensis Sun & Li, 2011

= Isodemis hainanensis =

Species of moth

Isodemis hainanensis is a moth of the family Tortricidae. It is known from Hainan, China.

The wingspan is about 17.5 mm for males and 22 mm for females.
