= Capua changi =

Scientific classification
- Kingdom: Animalia
- Phylum: Arthropoda
- Class: Insecta
- Order: Lepidoptera
- Family: Tortricidae
- Genus: Capua
- Species: C. changi

Binomial name
- Capua changi Kawabe, 1989

Species of moth

Capua changi is a species of moth of the family Tortricidae. It is found in Taiwan.
