= Capua arctophaea =

Scientific classification
- Kingdom: Animalia
- Phylum: Arthropoda
- Class: Insecta
- Order: Lepidoptera
- Family: Tortricidae
- Genus: Capua
- Species: C. arctophaea

Binomial name
- Capua arctophaea Meyrick, 1924

Species of moth

Capua arctophaea is a species of moth of the family Tortricidae. It is found in Uganda.
