= Isodemis ngoclinha =

Scientific classification
- Domain: Eukaryota
- Kingdom: Animalia
- Phylum: Arthropoda
- Class: Insecta
- Order: Lepidoptera
- Family: Tortricidae
- Genus: Isodemis
- Species: I. ngoclinha

Binomial name
- Isodemis ngoclinha Razowski, 2009

Species of moth

Isodemis ngoclinha is a moth of the family Tortricidae. It is found in Vietnam. The wingspan is 23 mm.
