= Capua pantherina =

Scientific classification
- Kingdom: Animalia
- Phylum: Arthropoda
- Class: Insecta
- Order: Lepidoptera
- Family: Tortricidae
- Genus: Capua
- Species: C. pantherina

Binomial name
- Capua pantherina (Meyrick, 1908)

Synonyms
- Epagoge pantherina Meyrick, 1908

Species of moth

Capua pantherina is a species of moth of the family Tortricidae. It is found in India.
