= Capua repentina =

Scientific classification
- Kingdom: Animalia
- Phylum: Arthropoda
- Class: Insecta
- Order: Lepidoptera
- Family: Tortricidae
- Genus: Capua
- Species: C. repentina

Binomial name
- Capua repentina Razowski, 1978

Species of moth

Capua repentina is a species of moth of the family Tortricidae. It is found in Shanxi, China.
