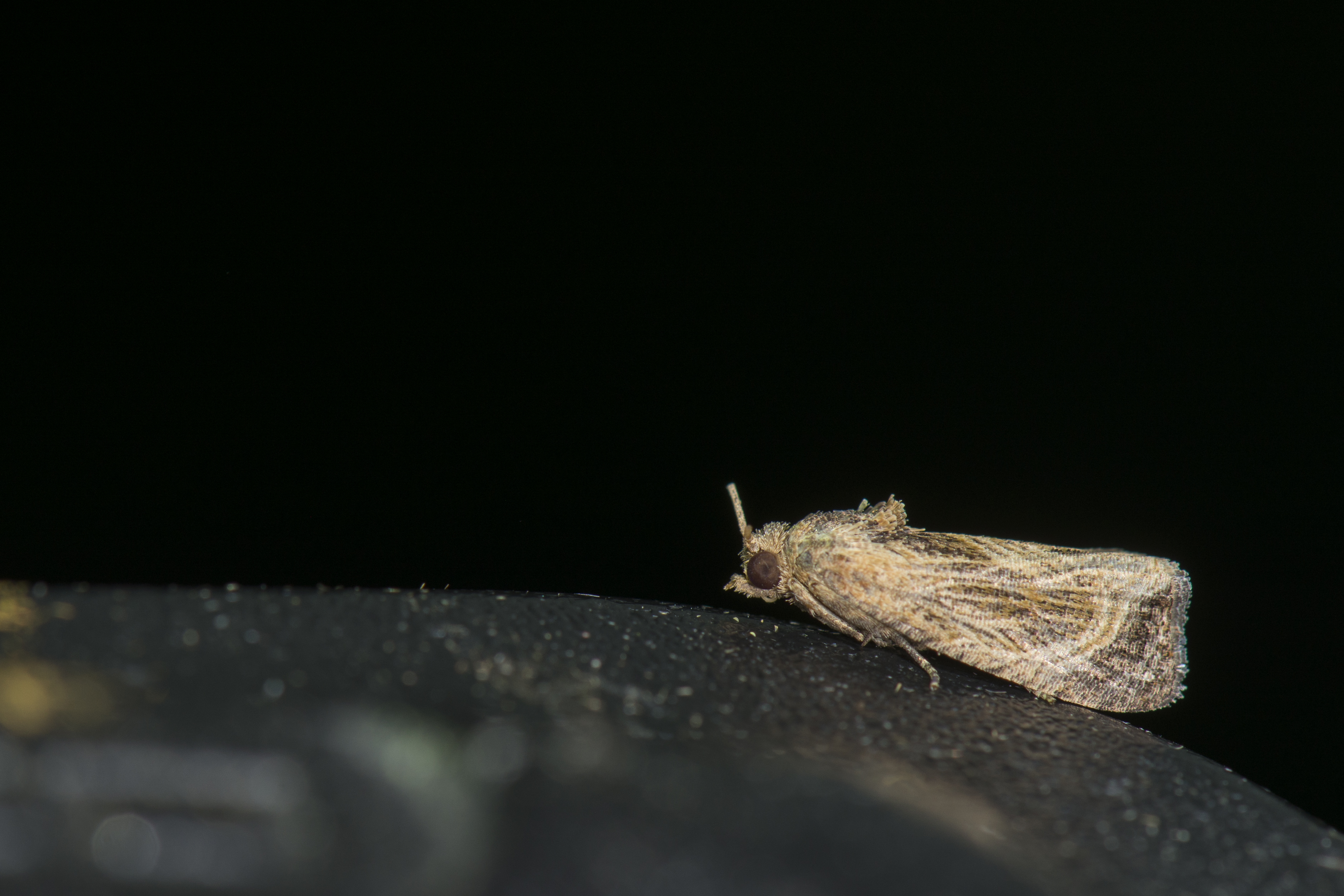

Scientific classification
- Kingdom: Animalia
- Phylum: Arthropoda
- Clade: Pancrustacea
- Class: Insecta
- Order: Lepidoptera
- Family: Tortricidae
- Genus: Cryptophlebia
- Species: C. repletana

Binomial name
- Cryptophlebia repletana (Walker, 1863)

Synonyms
- Carpocapsa repletana Walker, 1863; Argyroploce tetraploca Meyrick, 1928; Argyroploce trichosoma Meyrick, 1914

= Cryptophlebia repletana =

Species of moth

Cryptophlebia repletana is a moth of the family Tortricidae. It is found in South-East Asia, including the Philippines, Sarawak, Taiwan, Fiji and Japan.

The wingspan is 17–21 mm.
