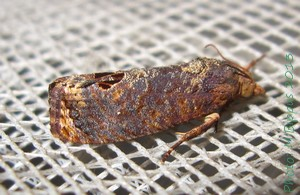

Scientific classification
- Kingdom: Animalia
- Phylum: Arthropoda
- Class: Insecta
- Order: Lepidoptera
- Family: Tortricidae
- Genus: Cryptophlebia
- Species: C. peltastica

Binomial name
- Cryptophlebia peltastica (Meyrick, 1921)

Synonyms
- Argyroploce peltastica Meyrick, 1921

= Cryptophlebia peltastica =

Species of moth

Cryptophlebia peltastica is a moth of the family Tortricidae. It is found throughout Africa from Ghana to South Africa and Eritrea, including islands of the Indian Ocean and is also known from Asia (Saudi Arabia, Indonesia), the Pacific region (Guam) and from the Bahamas.

This species is one of the main pests of Litchi chinensis, a (Sapindaceae). but the larvae have also been found on Nephelium sp., Mimosoideae (Parkia clappertoniana), and many Fabaceae species (Bauhinia sp., Canavalia ensiformis, Ceratonia siliqua, Poinciana regia, Tamarindus indica, Xenocarpus granatum, Cassia sp. and Feronia sp.).
