= Terthreutis chiangmaiana =

Scientific classification
- Kingdom: Animalia
- Phylum: Arthropoda
- Class: Insecta
- Order: Lepidoptera
- Family: Tortricidae
- Genus: Terthreutis
- Species: T. chiangmaiana

Binomial name
- Terthreutis chiangmaiana Razowski, 2008

Species of moth

Terthreutis chiangmaiana is a species of moth of the family Tortricidae. It is found in Thailand, where it has been recorded from altitudes between 1,070 and 1,500 meters.

The wingspan is about 20 mm. Adults have been recorded on wing from late April to early May and in February.

== Etymology ==
The species name refers to the type locality, Chiang Mai, Thailand.
