= Scotiophyes subtriangulata =

Scientific classification
- Domain: Eukaryota
- Kingdom: Animalia
- Phylum: Arthropoda
- Class: Insecta
- Order: Lepidoptera
- Family: Tortricidae
- Genus: Scotiophyes
- Species: S. subtriangulata

Binomial name
- Scotiophyes subtriangulata Wang, 2009

Species of moth

Scotiophyes subtriangulata is a species of moth of the family Tortricidae. It is found in Fujian, China.
