= Terthreutis xanthocycla =

Scientific classification
- Kingdom: Animalia
- Phylum: Arthropoda
- Class: Insecta
- Order: Lepidoptera
- Family: Tortricidae
- Genus: Terthreutis
- Species: T. xanthocycla

Binomial name
- Terthreutis xanthocycla (Meyrick in Caradja & Meyrick, 1938)

Synonyms
- Amniodes xanthocycla Meyrick in Caradja & Meyrick, 1938

Species of moth

Terthreutis xanthocycla is a species of moth of the family Tortricidae. It is found in Yunnan, China.

The wingspan is about 18 mm.
