= Pternozyga argodoxa =

Scientific classification
- Kingdom: Animalia
- Phylum: Arthropoda
- Class: Insecta
- Order: Lepidoptera
- Family: Tortricidae
- Genus: Pternozyga
- Species: P. argodoxa

Binomial name
- Pternozyga argodoxa Meyrick, 1922

Species of moth

Pternozyga argodoxa is a species of moth of the family Tortricidae. It is found in India.
