= Terthreutis kevini =

Scientific classification
- Kingdom: Animalia
- Phylum: Arthropoda
- Class: Insecta
- Order: Lepidoptera
- Family: Tortricidae
- Genus: Terthreutis
- Species: T. kevini

Binomial name
- Terthreutis kevini Razowski, 2008

Species of moth

Terthreutis kevini is a species of moth of the family Tortricidae. It is found in Thailand.

The wingspan is about 18 mm.

== Etymology ==
The species is named after Kevin R. Tuck.
