= Pternozyga anisoptera =

Scientific classification
- Domain: Eukaryota
- Kingdom: Animalia
- Phylum: Arthropoda
- Class: Insecta
- Order: Lepidoptera
- Family: Tortricidae
- Genus: Pternozyga
- Species: P. anisoptera

Binomial name
- Pternozyga anisoptera Diakonoff, 1941

Species of moth

Pternozyga anisoptera is a species of moth of the family Tortricidae. It is found on Java in Indonesia.
