= Terthreutis =

Scientific classification
- Kingdom: Animalia
- Phylum: Arthropoda
- Clade: Pancrustacea
- Class: Insecta
- Order: Lepidoptera
- Family: Tortricidae
- Tribe: Archipini
- Genus: Terthreutis; Meyrick, 1918

Synonyms
- Amniodes Meyrick, 1938; Terthretes Wileman & Stringer, 1929

Genus of tortrix moths

Terthreutis is a genus of moths belonging to the subfamily Tortricinae of the family Tortricidae.

== Species ==
- Terthreutis argentea (Butler, 1886)
- Terthreutis bipunctata Bai, 1993
- Terthreutis bulligera Meyrick, 1928
- Terthreutis chiangmaiana Razowski, 2008
- Terthreutis combesae Razowski, 2008
- Terthreutis duosticta Wileman & Stringer, 1929
- Terthreutis furcata Razowski, 2008
- Terthreutis jingae Buchsbaum & M.Y. Chen, 2013
- Terthreutis kevini Razowski, 2008
- Terthreutis orbicularis Bai, 1993
- Terthreutis series Bai, 1993
- Terthreutis sphaerocosma Meyrick, 1918
- Terthreutis xanthocycla (Meyrick in Caradja & Meyrick, 1938)

== See also ==
- List of Tortricidae genera
