= Isodemis solea =

Scientific classification
- Kingdom: Animalia
- Phylum: Arthropoda
- Class: Insecta
- Order: Lepidoptera
- Family: Tortricidae
- Genus: Isodemis
- Species: I. solea

Binomial name
- Isodemis solea Razowski, 2013

Species of moth

Isodemis solea is a species of moth of the family Tortricidae first described by Józef Razowski in 2013. It is found on Seram Island in Indonesia. The habitat consists of alluvial forests, bamboo and secondary forests.

The wingspan is about 12 mm. The ground colour of the forewings is pale rust, but paler in the posterior third of the wing where the markings are edged whitish. The markings themselves are dark rust brown. The hindwings are brown.

== Etymology ==
The species name refers to Solea, the type locality.
