= Chirapsina expleta =

Scientific classification
- Kingdom: Animalia
- Phylum: Arthropoda
- Class: Insecta
- Order: Lepidoptera
- Family: Tortricidae
- Genus: Chirapsina
- Species: C. expleta

Binomial name
- Chirapsina expleta (Meyrick, 1923)

Synonyms
- Cacoecia expleta Meyrick, 1923

Species of moth

Chirapsina expleta ( Meyrick, 1923) is a moth of the family Tortricidae. It is found in Assam, India.
