= Ulodemis tridentata =

Scientific classification
- Domain: Eukaryota
- Kingdom: Animalia
- Phylum: Arthropoda
- Class: Insecta
- Order: Lepidoptera
- Family: Tortricidae
- Genus: Ulodemis
- Species: U. tridentata

Binomial name
- Ulodemis tridentata Liu & Bai, 1982

Species of moth

Ulodemis tridentata is a species of moth of the family Tortricidae. It is found in Sichuan, China.
