= Terthreutis combesae =

Scientific classification
- Kingdom: Animalia
- Phylum: Arthropoda
- Class: Insecta
- Order: Lepidoptera
- Family: Tortricidae
- Genus: Terthreutis
- Species: T. combesae

Binomial name
- Terthreutis combesae Razowski, 2008

Species of moth

Terthreutis combesae is a species of moth of the family Tortricidae. It is found in Thailand.

The wingspan is about 25 mm.

== Etymology ==
The species is named after Jenny Combes, the wife of lepidopterist Kevin Tuck.
