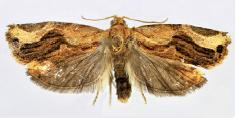
- Isodemis stenotera, female

Scientific classification
- Domain: Eukaryota
- Kingdom: Animalia
- Phylum: Arthropoda
- Class: Insecta
- Order: Lepidoptera
- Family: Tortricidae
- Tribe: Archipini
- Genus: Isodemis; Diakonoff, 1952

= Isodemis =

Genus of tortrix moths

Isodemis is a genus of moths belonging to the subfamily Tortricinae of the family Tortricidae.

The genus was erected by Alexey Diakonoff in 1952 for the type species Batodes serpentinana. Diakonoff (1976, 1983) transferred Tortrix illiberalis to Isodemis and described Isodemis stenotera from Sumatra. Józef Razowski (2000, 2009) described Isodemis proxima from Taiwan, and Isodemis brevicera, Isodemis longicera and Isodemis ngoclinha from Vietnam. Currently, Isodemis consists of twelve species, mainly distributed in South-east Asia.

== Diagnosis ==
Isodemis is characterized by the labial palpus obliquely uprising almost as high as the upper edge of the eye. The forewing is dominantly yellowish brown or ochreous brown, the median fascia is interrupted or indistinct near the costal margin. The male genitalia have a hooked gnathos and the valva have a C-shaped plica, with numerous fine wrinkles between the plica and costa. The female genitalia usually have a ductus bursae with a cestum and the single dentate signum with a conspicuous globular process placed posteriorly in the corpus bursae.

== Distribution ==
China, Vietnam, Thailand, Indonesia, Nepal, India and Sri Lanka.

== Species ==
- Isodemis brevicera Razowski, 2009
- Isodemis guangxiensis Sun & Li, 2011
- Isodemis hainanensis Sun & Li, 2011
- Isodemis illiberalis (Meyrick, 1918)
- Isodemis longicera Razowski, 2009
- Isodemis ngoclinha Razowski, 2009
- Isodemis phloiosignum Razowski, 2013
- Isodemis proxima Razowski, 2000
- Isodemis quadrata Sun & Li, 2011
- Isodemis serpentinana (Walker, 1863)
- Isodemis solea Razowski, 2013
- Isodemis stenotera Diakonoff, 1983

== See also ==
- List of Tortricidae genera
