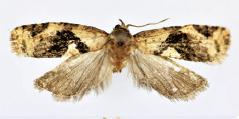

Scientific classification
- Domain: Eukaryota
- Kingdom: Animalia
- Phylum: Arthropoda
- Class: Insecta
- Order: Lepidoptera
- Family: Tortricidae
- Genus: Isodemis
- Species: I. guangxiensis

Binomial name
- Isodemis guangxiensis Sun & Li, 2011

= Isodemis guangxiensis =

Species of moth

Isodemis guangxiensis is a moth of the family Tortricidae. It is known from Guangxi, China.

The wingspan is 18–18.5 mm for males.
