= Capua spilonoma =

Scientific classification
- Kingdom: Animalia
- Phylum: Arthropoda
- Class: Insecta
- Order: Lepidoptera
- Family: Tortricidae
- Genus: Capua
- Species: C. spilonoma

Binomial name
- Capua spilonoma Meyrick, 1932

Species of moth

Capua spilonoma is a species of moth of the family Tortricidae. It is found in Ethiopia and Uganda.

== Subspecies ==
- Capua spilonoma spilonoma (Ethiopia)
- Capua spilonoma gitona Bradley, 1965 (Uganda)
