= Terthreutis sphaerocosma =

Scientific classification
- Kingdom: Animalia
- Phylum: Arthropoda
- Class: Insecta
- Order: Lepidoptera
- Family: Tortricidae
- Genus: Terthreutis
- Species: T. sphaerocosma

Binomial name
- Terthreutis sphaerocosma Meyrick, 1918

Species of moth

Terthreutis sphaerocosma is a species of moth of the family Tortricidae. It is found in India (Assam, Sikkim), Bhutan and Nepal.

The wingspan is 20–25 mm.
