= Capua reclina =

Scientific classification
- Kingdom: Animalia
- Phylum: Arthropoda
- Class: Insecta
- Order: Lepidoptera
- Family: Tortricidae
- Genus: Capua
- Species: C. reclina

Binomial name
- Capua reclina Razowski, 1978

Species of moth

Capua reclina is a species of moth in the family Tortricidae, which lives in Shanxi, China.
