= Thaumatotibia aclyta =

Scientific classification
- Kingdom: Animalia
- Phylum: Arthropoda
- Class: Insecta
- Order: Lepidoptera
- Family: Tortricidae
- Genus: Thaumatotibia
- Species: T. aclyta

Binomial name
- Thaumatotibia aclyta (Turner, 1916)

Synonyms
- Alypeta aclyta Turner, 1916

Species of moth

Thaumatotibia aclyta is a species of moth of the family Tortricidae. It is found in New Caledonia and Australia, where it has been recorded from Queensland.

The wingspan is about 14 mm. The forewings are whitish, irrorated (sprinkled) with fuscous. There is a small dark-fuscous crest of scales on the mid-dorsum. The posterior half of the costa is barred with fuscous. The hindwings are grey whitish.
