= Meridemis subbathymorpha =

Scientific classification
- Domain: Eukaryota
- Kingdom: Animalia
- Phylum: Arthropoda
- Class: Insecta
- Order: Lepidoptera
- Family: Tortricidae
- Genus: Meridemis
- Species: M. subbathymorpha

Binomial name
- Meridemis subbathymorpha Razowski, 2006

Species of moth

Meridemis subbathymorpha is a species of moth of the family Tortricidae. It is found in India (Jammu and Kashmir).

The wingspan is about 13 millimetres (0.51 in).
