= Terthreutis bipunctata =

Scientific classification
- Domain: Eukaryota
- Kingdom: Animalia
- Phylum: Arthropoda
- Class: Insecta
- Order: Lepidoptera
- Family: Tortricidae
- Genus: Terthreutis
- Species: T. bipunctata

Binomial name
- Terthreutis bipunctata Bai, 1993

Species of moth

Terthreutis bipunctata is a species of moth of the family Tortricidae. It is found in Hainan, China.
