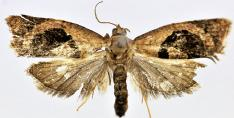

Scientific classification
- Kingdom: Animalia
- Phylum: Arthropoda
- Class: Insecta
- Order: Lepidoptera
- Family: Tortricidae
- Genus: Isodemis
- Species: I. illiberalis

Binomial name
- Isodemis illiberalis (Meyrick, 1918)

Synonyms
- Tortrix illiberalis Meyrick, 1918; Cacoecia interjecta Meyrick, 1922; Syndemis montivola Diakonoff, 1941; Isodemis illiberalis

= Isodemis illiberalis =

Species of moth

Isodemis illiberalis is a moth of the family Tortricidae. It is known from China (Guangdong, Guangxi, Yunnan), Vietnam, Thailand, India and Nepal.

The wingspan is 16–19.5 mm.
