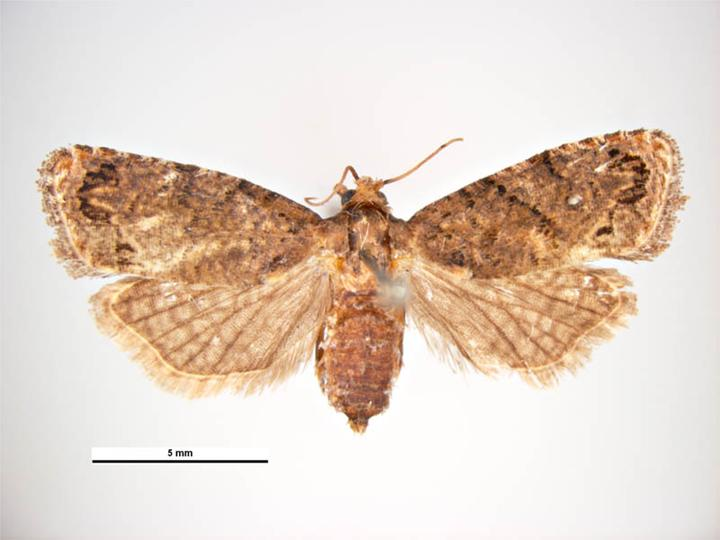
- Female
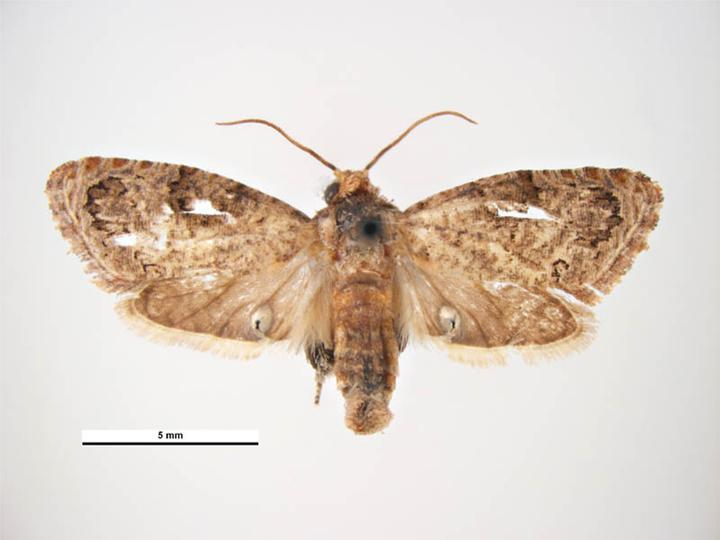
- Male

Scientific classification
- Kingdom: Animalia
- Phylum: Arthropoda
- Class: Insecta
- Order: Lepidoptera
- Family: Tortricidae
- Genus: Thaumatotibia
- Species: T. leucotreta

Binomial name
- Thaumatotibia leucotreta (Meyrick, 1913)

= False codling moth =

Species of moth in family Tortricidae

Thaumatotibia (Cryptophlebia) leucotreta, commonly known as the false codling moth, orange moth, citrus codling moth or orange codling moth, is a moth in the family Tortricidae under the order of Lepidoptera. Larvae of the moth feed on a wide range of crops from cotton and macadamia nuts to Citrus species. The larvae have a less selective diet than the codling moth, which feeds primarily on temperate fruit crops.

The moth is believed to have originated in Sub-Saharan Africa. Outside of Africa the false codling moth has had limited success in establishing itself; however, this insect has been detected in Europe and the United States. From 1984 to 2008, there have been 1500 interceptions of the moth on 99 plant taxa at 34 ports of entry in the United States.

The false codling moth is adapted for warm climate survival. Temperatures below 10 degrees Celsius impede development and reduce survival rates. Below 1 degree Celsius, all stages of the life cycle are terminated resulting in death. The species is prone to alternate-year infestation severity. Under ideal conditions (warm and humid) up to five generations a year may be produced.

== Life cycle ==
The false codling moth experiences four life stages; egg, larva, pupa and adult.

=== Egg ===
Female moths lay their eggs between 5:00 p.m. and 11:00 p.m. The eggs are deposited on the surface of the host fruit over irregular intervals throughout the female's life. Under ideal conditions (25 °C) a single moth can produce up to 800 eggs. Egg incubation is temperature dependent and the period from deposition to hatching ranges from 2 to 22 days. Higher temperatures correlate to quicker developmental rates. Eggs are ovoid in shape with a granulated surface. They have a cream to white color when first laid that changes to a reddish color as development progresses. Sizes vary around 0.77 mm in length, 0.60 mm in width, and 1 mm in diameter.

=== Larva ===
Once hatched from the eggs the larvae burrow a 1 mm diameter hole into the host fruit. A discoloration appears at the wound site. Once the larvae are inside the pulp they begin to feed. Young larvae feed on the outer portion while older specimens move further into the interior of the fruit. Only a few larvae may survive per fruit. This stage lasts from 12 to 67 days depending on weather conditions. Upon maturity the larvae exit the fruit and drop to the ground on silken threads. Initially, on emergence from the egg, the larvae are only 1 mm and spotted. By the time of emergence from the fruit the larva have grown to roughly 15 mm and have developed an orange and pink color.

=== Pupa ===
In the pupa stage the false codling moth larvae spin a cream colored cocoon in the soil. Metamorphosis then occurs. The length of this stage is both temperature and gender regulated. Warmer periods are conducive to a quick emergence, while cooler temperatures render the process to a slower rate. Male moths require between 13 and 47 days to reach maturity and females need between 11 and 39 days.

=== Adult ===
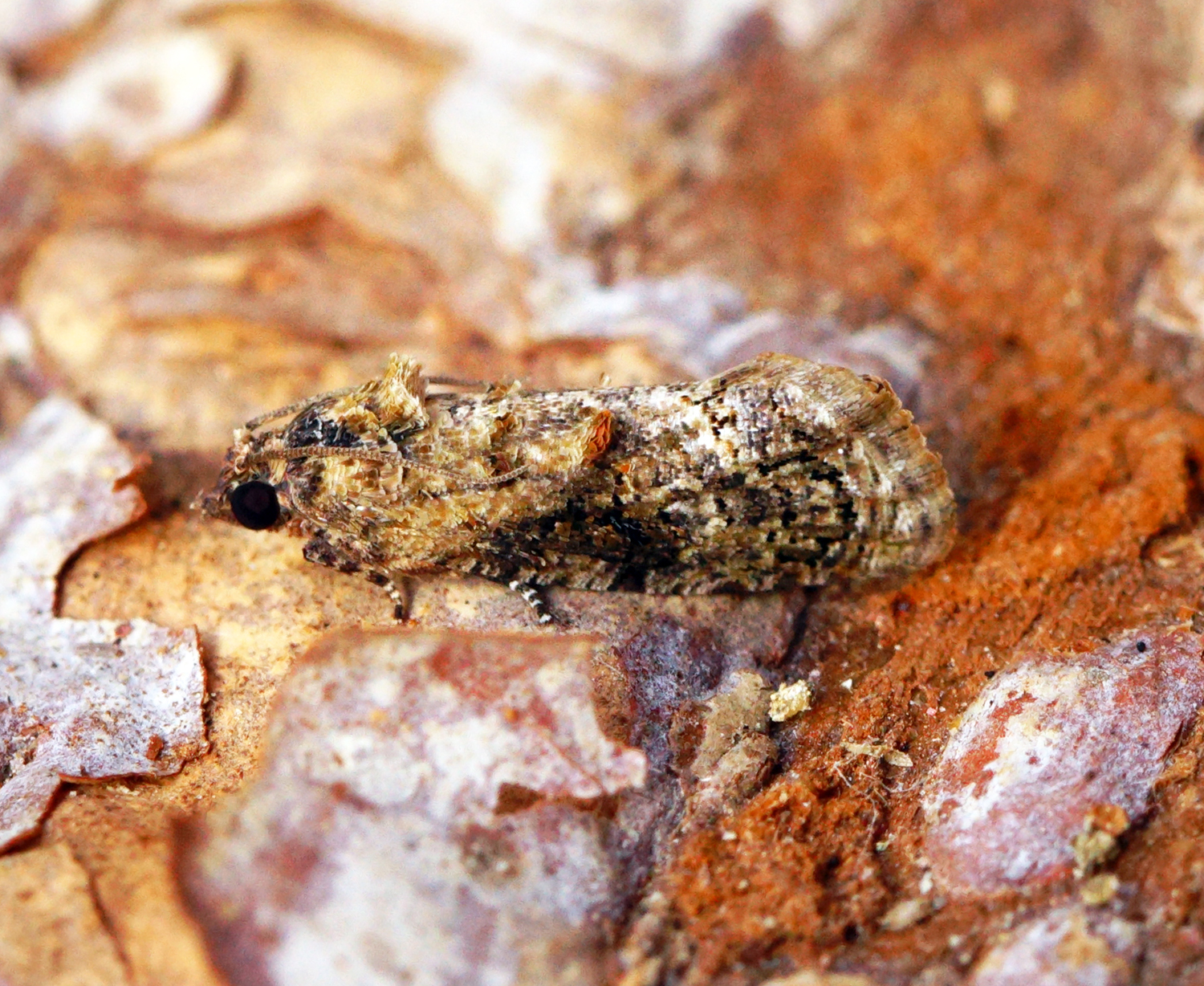
Left side view of an adult Thaumatotibia leucotreta.

The final adult stage of the moth occurs when the winged insect emerges from its cocoon. The moths are inactive during the day and are only active during portions of the night, isolated to within several hundred meters of their birth. Males may live between 14 and 57 days, whereas females will live between 16 and 70 days. Adults have patterned 1.25 to 2 cm wings with a variation of colors: grey, brown, black, and orange brown. A female's hindwing is slightly larger than a male's.

== Impact ==
The false codling moth presents a problem to the citrus industry. All stages of fruit development of citrus are susceptible to a false codling moth infestation. Eggs are laid on the surface of the fruit. After emerging from the egg the larvae burrow into the rind. In citruses such as the orange the skin around the point of penetration develops a brown discoloration. The bored hole itself will also show signs of stress, excreting a brown substance. Once the fruit has been penetrated it is no longer a marketable item, and once compromised, the incidence of disease and mold increases. The open cavity is a point of entry for other pests and pathogens. Often fruits afflicted early in development prematurely drop. A USDA (United States Department of Agriculture) figure estimates crop yield losses as high as 20 percent in some cases. The establishment of a false codling moth population results in increased pesticide usage.

== Management ==
Prevention is the preferred practice when dealing with the false codling moth. Inspections of imported and exported goods prevent the spread of the moth. There are several means to deal with an infestation and new developments are on the cusp of implementation.

A 1921 bulletin on the false codling moth produced by the South African government outlines measures on how to deal with an infestation. It discredits banding the trees with nets as an effective practice and promotes destroying all natural fruit trees near the orchard, collecting and destroying all fallen fruits, spraying arsenate of lead, and flooding the orchard during the winter months. Later, increased knowledge of the harmful effects of lead to humans ended the practice of spraying acetate of lead.

One of the more common pesticides in use is benzyl-urea. However, in some locations the false codling moth has developed some resistance. Other tactics for managing the moth use the power of attraction. Mercury vapor light traps and pheromonal traps are used lure the adults where they can be captured. There have been incidences of quarantining a section of an infected orchard.

A team at Rhodes University in South Africa is in the process of developing a virus that attacks the false codling moth. The insect-pathogenic virus is known as Cryptophlebia leucotreta granulovirus (CLGV) and lives in the digestive tract of the moth. An infection results in a reduction in appetite and eventual death. The pathogen is also capable of mutations and will be able to withstand possible resistance the moths may develop to the virus.

== Areas of incidence ==
The false codling moth is well established in Africa and is commonly spread by the transport of produce carrying the insect. The following locations are where the moth is known to occur; Angola, Benin, Burkina Faso, Burundi, Cameroon, Cape Verde, Central African Republic, Chad, Côte d'Ivoire, Democratic Republic of the Congo, Eritrea, Eswatini, Ethiopia, Gambia, Ghana, Israel, Kenya, Madagascar, Malawi, Mali, Mauritius, Mozambique, Niger, Nigeria, Rwanda, Saint Helena, Senegal, Sierra Leone, Somalia, South Africa, Sudan, Tanzania, Togo, Uganda, Zambia, and Zimbabwe
