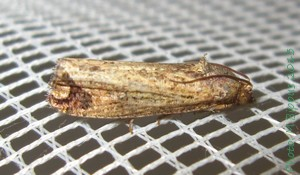
- Cryptophlebia semilunana

Scientific classification
- Kingdom: Animalia
- Phylum: Arthropoda
- Clade: Pancrustacea
- Class: Insecta
- Order: Lepidoptera
- Family: Tortricidae
- Tribe: Grapholitini
- Genus: Cryptophlebia; Walsingham, 1900

Species
- Phanerophlebia Diakonoff, 1957; Pogonozada Hampson, 1905

= Cryptophlebia =

Genus of tortrix moths

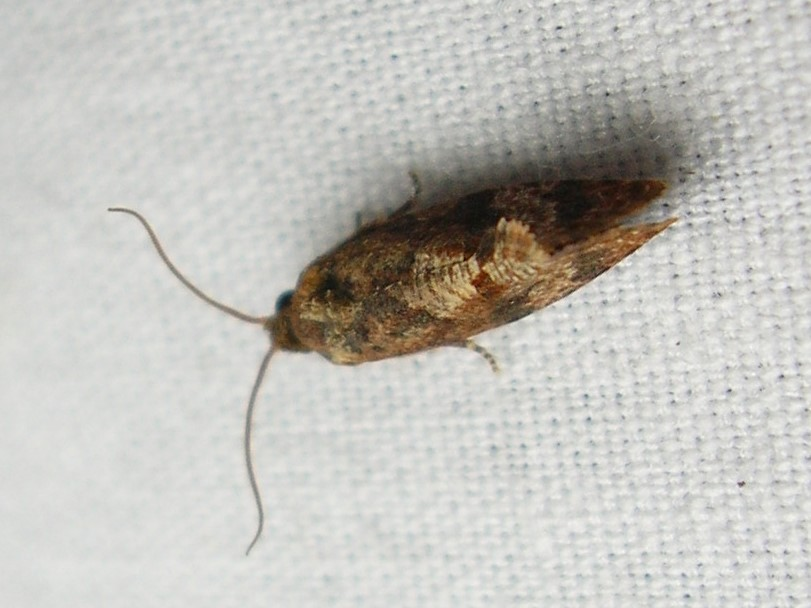
Cryptophlebia illepida

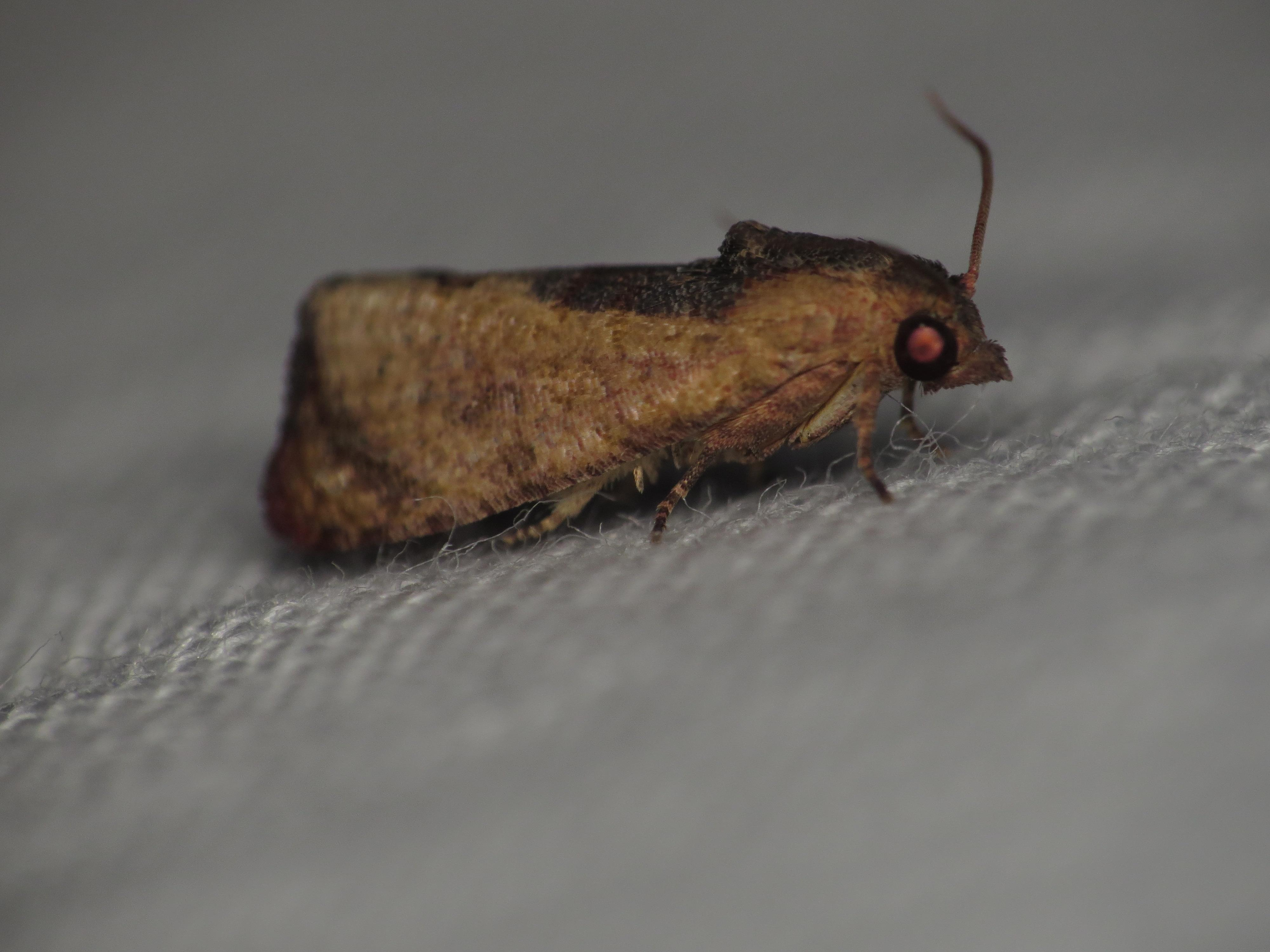
Cryptophlebia ombrodelta

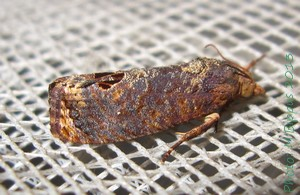
Cryptophlebia peltastica

Cryptophlebia is a genus of moths belonging to the subfamily Olethreutinae of the family Tortricidae. It occurs in all biogeographical regions except for the Nearctic.

== Description ==
Adult Cryptophlebia are moderately sized moths with brown forewings and variable, subdued patterns. There is often a darker brown pretornal patch that is more pronounced in females. Males have sex scales on the abdomen, legs and special pockets on the hindwing. The genitalia of males has swollen valvae with multiple long spines on the cucullus' inner surface. The genitalia of females has an ovate or V-shaped sterigma, a ductus bursae that is widened anteriorly, and a corpus bursae with two signa.

Larvae are mostly whitish or pinkish, except for a brown head and prothoracic shield, and dark pinacula (sclerotised plates bearing setae). The anal comb (a feature in many Tortricidae) is usually absent. The first thoracic segment has a large prespiracular pinaculum that extends under the spiracle. The eight abdominal segment has its spiracles located near the posterodorsal margins.

== Ecology ==
Cryptophlebia larvae are borers in a range of plant tissues: stems, fruits, pods, nuts and seeds. Some are considered pests, e.g. of lychee and macadamia.

A population of C. ombrodelta in Western Australia has an unusual ecology, as its larvae mostly inhabit woody galls of Acacia saligna with only one report from macadamia.

== Species ==
- Cryptophlebia amamiana Komai & Nasu, 2003
- Cryptophlebia amblyopa Clarke, 1976
- Cryptophlebia amethystina (Diakonoff, 1953)
- Cryptophlebia aniacra Diakonoff, 1983
- Cryptophlebia aphos Diakonoff, 1983
- Cryptophlebia atrilinea Clarke, 1976
- Cryptophlebia azuaya Razowski, 1999
- Cryptophlebia caeca Diakonoff, 1969
- Cryptophlebia callosoma Clarke, 1976
- Cryptophlebia carpophagoides Clarke, 1951
- Cryptophlebia carreella Guillermet, 2013
- Cryptophlebia cartarica Diakonoff, 1984
- Cryptophlebia colasi Guillermet, 2006
- Cryptophlebia cortesi Clarke, 1987
- Cryptophlebia destrumeli Guillermet, 2006
- Cryptophlebia distorta (Hampson, 1905)
- Cryptophlebia farraginea (Meyrick, 1931)
- Cryptophlebia gaetani Guillermet, 2006
- Cryptophlebia gomyi Guillermet, 2004
- Cryptophlebia hemon Diakonoff, 1983
- Cryptophlebia heterospina Razowski, 2013
- Cryptophlebia horii Kawabe, 1987
- Cryptophlebia illepida (Butler, 1882)
- Cryptophlebia iridoschema Bradley, 1962
- Cryptophlebia iridosoma (Meyrick, 1911)
- Cryptophlebia isomalla (Meyrick, 1927)
- Cryptophlebia lasiandra (Meyrick, 1909)
- Cryptophlebia melanopoda Diakonoff, in Wittmer & Bttiker, 1983
- Cryptophlebia micrometra Diakonoff, 1976
- Cryptophlebia moriutii Kawabe, 1989
- Cryptophlebia nota Kawabe, 1978
- Cryptophlebia notopeta Diakonoff, 1988
- Cryptophlebia ombrodelta (Lower, 1898)
- Cryptophlebia omphala Razowski, 2013
- Cryptophlebia pallifimbriana Bradley, 1953
- Cryptophlebia palustris Komai & Nasu, 2003
- Cryptophlebia peltastica (Meyrick, 1921)
- Cryptophlebia perfracta Diakonoff, 1957
- Cryptophlebia phaeacma (Meyrick, 1931)
- Cryptophlebia repletana (Walker, 1863)
- Cryptophlebia rhizophorae Vri, 1981
- Cryptophlebia rhynchias (Meyrick, 1905)
- Cryptophlebia saileri Clarke, 1987
- Cryptophlebia scioessa (Turner, 1946)
- Cryptophlebia semilunana (Saalmuller, 1880)
- Cryptophlebia sigerui Kawabe, 1995
- Cryptophlebia strepsibathra (Meyrick, 1928)
- Cryptophlebia sumatrana Diakonoff, 1957
- Cryptophlebia toxogramma (Meyrick, 1925)
- Cryptophlebia toxotis (Diakonoff, 1953)
- Cryptophlebia vitiensis Bradley, 1953
- Cryptophlebia williamsi Bradley, 1953
- Cryptophlebia yasudai Kawabe, 1972

== See also ==
- List of Tortricidae genera
