= Meridemis insulata =

Scientific classification
- Kingdom: Animalia
- Phylum: Arthropoda
- Class: Insecta
- Order: Lepidoptera
- Family: Tortricidae
- Genus: Meridemis
- Species: M. insulata

Binomial name
- Meridemis insulata (Meyrick, 1908)

Synonyms
- Tortrix insulata Meyrick, 1908

Species of moth

Meridemis insulata is a species of moth of the family Tortricidae. It is found in India.
