= Terthreutis bulligera =

Scientific classification
- Kingdom: Animalia
- Phylum: Arthropoda
- Class: Insecta
- Order: Lepidoptera
- Family: Tortricidae
- Genus: Terthreutis
- Species: T. bulligera

Binomial name
- Terthreutis bulligera Meyrick, 1928

Species of moth

Terthreutis bulligera is a species of moth of the family Tortricidae. It is found in India (Bengal, Sikkim), Nepal, Taiwan and Vietnam.

The wingspan is about 20 mm.
