= Pternozyga haeretica =

Scientific classification
- Kingdom: Animalia
- Phylum: Arthropoda
- Class: Insecta
- Order: Lepidoptera
- Family: Tortricidae
- Genus: Pternozyga
- Species: P. haeretica

Binomial name
- Pternozyga haeretica Meyrick, 1908

Species of moth

Pternozyga haeretica is a species of moth of the family Tortricidae. It is found in India, where it has been recorded from the Palni Hills and the Nilgiri mountains.
