= Ulodemis trigrapha =

Scientific classification
- Kingdom: Animalia
- Phylum: Arthropoda
- Class: Insecta
- Order: Lepidoptera
- Family: Tortricidae
- Genus: Ulodemis
- Species: U. trigrapha

Binomial name
- Ulodemis trigrapha Meyrick, 1907

Synonyms
- Ulodemis falsa Meyrick, 1914

Species of moth

Ulodemis trigrapha is a moth of the family Tortricidae. It is found in Bhutan, Vietnam and India.
