= Acleris napaea =

Scientific classification
- Kingdom: Animalia
- Phylum: Arthropoda
- Class: Insecta
- Order: Lepidoptera
- Family: Tortricidae
- Genus: Acleris
- Species: A. napaea

Binomial name
- Acleris napaea (Meyrick, 1912)

Synonyms
- Peronea napaea Meyrick, 1912; Acleris heringi Razowski, 1958; Peronea sheljuzhkoi Obraztsov, 1943

Species of moth

Acleris napaea is a species of moth of the family Tortricidae. It is found from Iran, Pakistan and Afghanistan eastward to Uzbekistan, Armenia and Turkmenistan. It is also found in Southeast Europe.

The wingspan is 18–26 mm. The forewings are grey, irrorated (sprinkled) with dark grey and whitish and mixed with brown. The hindwings are light grey. Adults have been recorded on wing from May to November.

The larvae feed on Salix species and Populus nigra
