= Scotiophyes faeculosa =

Scientific classification
- Kingdom: Animalia
- Phylum: Arthropoda
- Class: Insecta
- Order: Lepidoptera
- Family: Tortricidae
- Genus: Scotiophyes
- Species: S. faeculosa

Binomial name
- Scotiophyes faeculosa (Meyrick, 1928)

Synonyms
- Adoxophyes faeculosa Meyrick, 1928

Species of moth

Scotiophyes faeculosa is a moth of the family Tortricidae. It is found in India, Thailand, Vietnam, Nepal and China (Likiang).
