= Thaumatotibia encarpa =

Scientific classification
- Kingdom: Animalia
- Phylum: Arthropoda
- Class: Insecta
- Order: Lepidoptera
- Family: Tortricidae
- Genus: Thaumatotibia
- Species: T. encarpa

Binomial name
- Thaumatotibia encarpa (Meyrick, 1920)

Synonyms
- Argyroploce encarpa Meyrick, 1920; Cryptophlebia encarpa

Species of moth

Thaumatotibia encarpa, the cacao husk borer, is a moth of the family Tortricidae. It is found in south-east Asia, including India, the Chagos Archipelago, New Guinea, Sri Lanka, Vietnam and Malaysia.

The larvae feed on the leaves, fruit and seeds of Citrus, Litchi chinensis, Theobroma cacao and Ziziphus jujuba.
