= Chirapsina hemixantha =

Scientific classification
- Kingdom: Animalia
- Phylum: Arthropoda
- Class: Insecta
- Order: Lepidoptera
- Family: Tortricidae
- Genus: Chirapsina
- Species: C. hemixantha

Binomial name
- Chirapsina hemixantha (Meyrick, 1918)

Synonyms
- Cacoecia hemixantha Meyrick, 1918; Archips hemixantha

Species of moth

Chirapsina hemixantha is a moth of the family Tortricidae. It is found in India and Vietnam.

The wingspan is 30–32 mm.

The larvae are polyphagous.
