= Meridemis invalidana =

Scientific classification
- Kingdom: Animalia
- Phylum: Arthropoda
- Class: Insecta
- Order: Lepidoptera
- Family: Tortricidae
- Genus: Meridemis
- Species: M. invalidana

Binomial name
- Meridemis invalidana (Walker, 1863)

Synonyms
- Tortrix invalidana Walker, 1863; Epagoge invalidana Meyrick, 1908; Capua invalidana Meyrick, 1912; Dichelia detractana (nec Walker) Walsingham, in Swinhoe, 1885; Epagoge retractana (nec Walker) Walsingham, 1900; Capua retractana (nec Walker) Meyrick, 1912; Homona retractana (nec Walker) Obraztsov, 1954; Meridemis invalidana Diakonoff, 1976

Species of moth

Meridemis invalidana is a species of moth of the family Tortricidae first described by Francis Walker in 1863. It is found in India, Sri Lanka, Nepal, Vietnam, Malaysia, China, Taiwan and Korea.

The larvae feed on Piper betle.
