= Archips micaceana =

Scientific classification
- Kingdom: Animalia
- Phylum: Arthropoda
- Clade: Pancrustacea
- Class: Insecta
- Order: Lepidoptera
- Family: Tortricidae
- Genus: Archips
- Species: A. micaceana

Binomial name
- Archips micaceana (Walker, 1863)

Synonyms
- Cacoecia micaceana Walker, 1863; Cacoecia eucroca Diakonoff, 1958; Cacoecia micaceana var. obscura Diakonoff, 1939

Species of moth

Archips micaceana is a moth of the family Tortricidae. It is found in China, Hong Kong, southern Vietnam, Burma, and northern Thailand. It is a minor pest of many agricultural crops.

The hindwings are almost entirely yellow in both sexes.

== Food ==
The larvae are polyphagous leaf-tiers and leaf-rollers on:

- Abelmoschus esculentus
- Acacia nilotica
- Alangium salviifolium
- Albizzia procera
- Albizzia saman
- Aleurites
- Annona reticulata
- Annona squamosa
- Arachis hypogaea
- Areca catechu
- Artabotrys hexapetalus
- Artocarpus heterophyllus
- Aster
- Azadirachta excelsa
- Breonia chinensis
- Camellia
- Capsicum
- Cassia fistula
- Castanopsis fissa
- Cedrela
- Chrysanthemum
- Citrus maxima
- Codiaeum variegatum
- Coffea
- Cordyline fruticosa
- Cosmos
- Cuscuta
- Dalbergia sissoo
- Delonix regia
- Derris
- Dillenia indica
- Dimocarpus longan
- Duranta
- Erythrina fusca
- Erythrina variegata
- Eucalyptus camaldulensis
- Eugenia
- Fragaria
- Garcinia mangostana
- Gerbera jamesonii
- Glycine max
- Gmelina arborea
- Gossypium herbaceum
- Helianthus annuus
- Hibiscus
- Hopea odorata
- Ixora
- Lagerstroemia cuspidata
- Lantana camara
- Linum
- Litchi chinensis
- Lonicera japonica
- Ludwigia
- Macropiper excelsum
- Mallotus philippinensis
- Malus pumila
- Mangifera indica
- Medicago
- Michelia champaca
- Millettia extensa
- Morus alba
- Nephelium lappaceum
- Persea americana
- Phaseolus
- Pinus caribaea
- Pithecellobium dulce
- Psidium guajava
- Punica granatum
- Rhizophora mucronata
- Ricinus communis
- Salix
- Santalum album
- Schoutenia glomerata
- Shorea talura
- Spergularia macrotheca
- Syzygium aquem
- Syzygium cumini
- Terminalia elliptica
- Toona ciliata
- Triticum aestivum
- Vicia faba
- Vigna radiata
- Zea mays
- Ziziphus mauritiana
