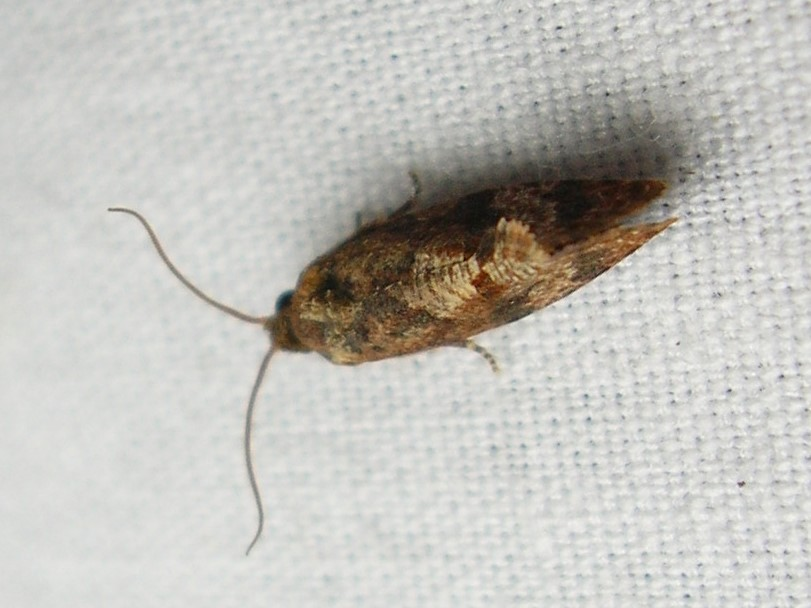

Scientific classification
- Kingdom: Animalia
- Phylum: Arthropoda
- Class: Insecta
- Order: Lepidoptera
- Family: Tortricidae
- Genus: Cryptophlebia
- Species: C. illepida

Binomial name
- Cryptophlebia illepida (Butler, 1882)

Synonyms
- Teras illepida Butler, 1882; Argyroploce illepida; Cryptophlebia illepida var. fulva Walsingham in Sharp, 1907; Cryptophlebia illepida var. suffusa Walsingham in Sharp, 1907; Cryptophlebia tetrao Walsingham in Sharp, 1907; Cryptophlebia vulpes Walsingham in Sharp, 1907

= Cryptophlebia illepida =

Species of moth

Cryptophlebia illepida is a species of moth in the family Tortricidae that is endemic to the islands of Kauaʻi, Oʻahu, Molokaʻi, Maui, Lānaʻi and Hawaiʻi. Common names include koa seedworm, klu tortricid, koa seed moth, litchi borer, litchi moth, macadamia nut borer and macadamia nut moth. It was first described by Arthur Gardiner Butler in 1882.

The wingspan is 12–25 mm. It is a very variable species.

The larvae feed on a wide range of plants. Recorded food plants are Acacia confusa, Acacia farnesiana, Acacia koa, Acacia koaia, Alectryon macrococcus, Caesalpinia kavaiensis, Dodonaea viscosa, Inga edulis, Litchi chinensis, Macadamia ternifolia, Mangifera indica, Phaseolus, Pithecellobium dulce, Sapindus oahuensis, Sapindus saponaria, and Senna surattensis.
