= Helictophanes dryocoma =

Scientific classification
- Kingdom: Animalia
- Phylum: Arthropoda
- Class: Insecta
- Order: Lepidoptera
- Family: Tortricidae
- Genus: Helictophanes
- Species: H. dryocoma

Binomial name
- Helictophanes dryocoma (Meyrick, 1916)

Synonyms
- Argyroploce dryocoma Meyrick, 1916; Helictophanes dryocoma Clarke, 1958

Species of moth

Helictophanes dryocoma is a moth of the family Tortricidae first described by Edward Meyrick in 1916. It is found in Sri Lanka and India.
