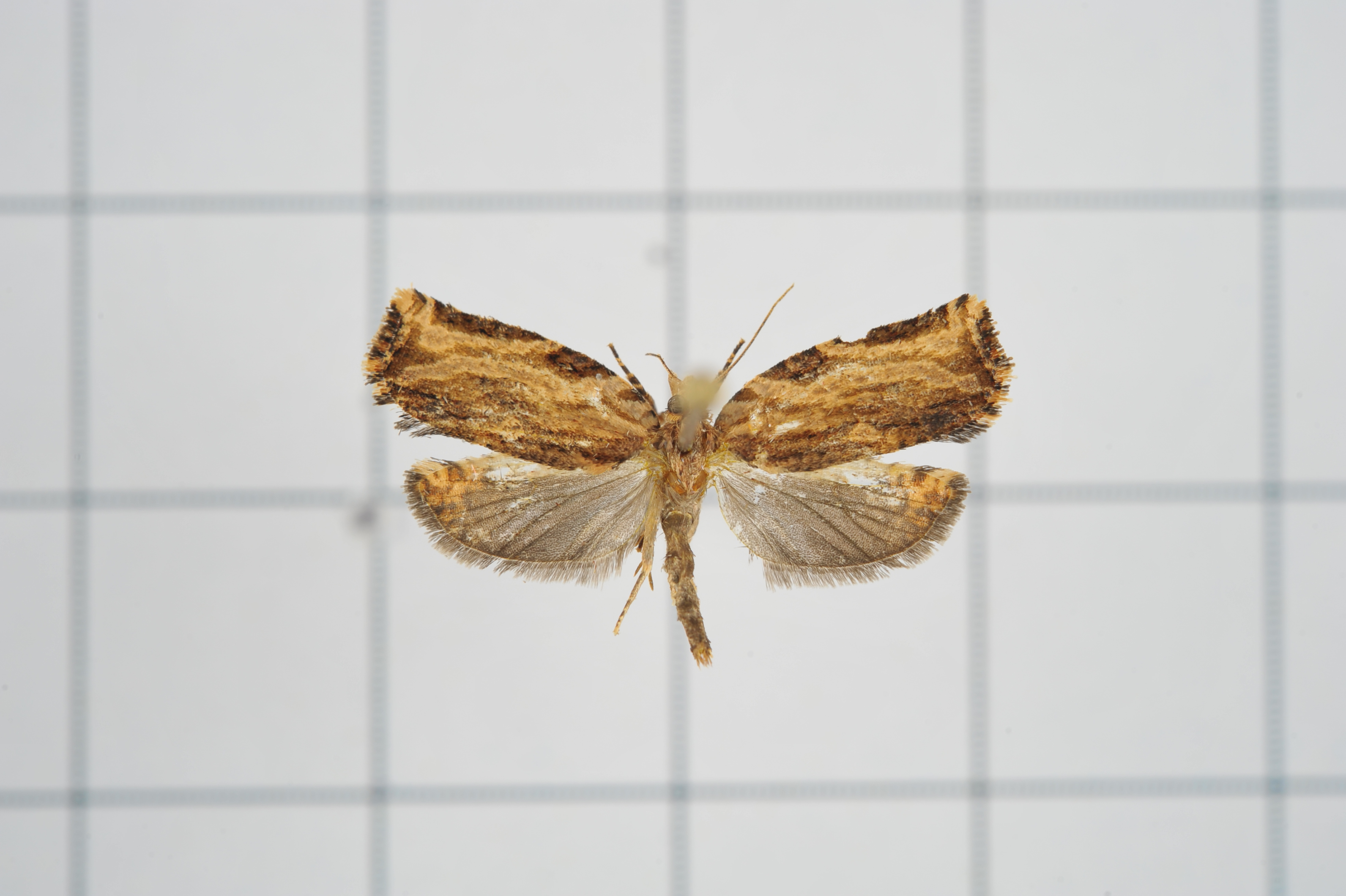

Scientific classification
- Kingdom: Animalia
- Phylum: Arthropoda
- Class: Insecta
- Order: Lepidoptera
- Family: Tortricidae
- Genus: Isodemis
- Species: I. serpentinana

Binomial name
- Isodemis serpentinana (Walker, 1863)

Synonyms
- Batodes serpentinana Walker 1863; Cacoecia serpentinana Meyrick, 1912; Tortrix serpentinana; Syndemis serpentinana Diakonoff, 1941; Tortrix sulana Walker 1866

= Isodemis serpentinana =

Species of moth

Isodemis serpentinana is a moth of the family Tortricidae first described by Francis Walker in 1863. It is known from China (Hainan, Yunnan, Taiwan), India, Indonesia (Borneo, Java, Sumatra), New Guinea, the Philippines, Sri Lanka and Thailand.

Differentiated by related species from phallus bearing two unequal cornuti in male genitalia. Sub-apical blotch is sub-triangular.
