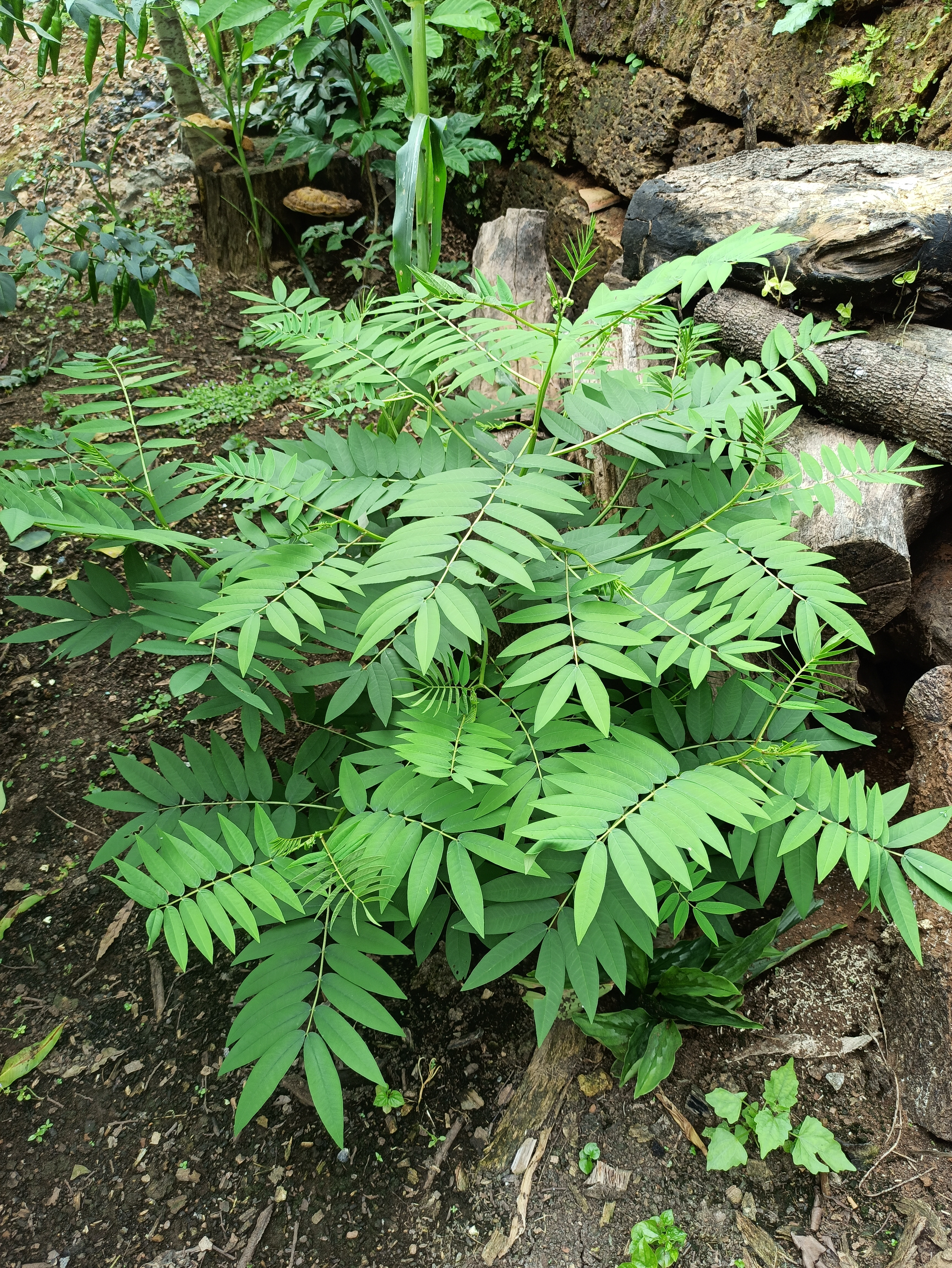
- Habit

Scientific classification
- Kingdom: Plantae
- Clade: Tracheophytes
- Clade: Angiosperms
- Clade: Eudicots
- Clade: Rosids
- Order: Fabales
- Family: Fabaceae
- Subfamily: Caesalpinioideae
- Genus: Senna
- Species: S. sophera

Binomial name
- Senna sophera (L.) Roxb

Synonyms
- List: Cassia aegyptiaca Willd.; Cassia atroviridis Span.; Cassia canca Cav.; Cassia chinensis Jacq., nom. illeg.; Cassia coromandeliana Jacq.; Cassia esculenta Roxb., nom. nud.; Cassia frutescens Mill.; Cassia geminiflora Schrank, nom. illeg.; Cassia indica Poir.; Cassia lanceolata Pers., nom. illeg.; Cassia ligustrina Forssk. ex Benth., nom. illeg.; Cassia linearis Michx.; Cassia patula Aiton; Cassia proboscidea Pollard; Cassia purpurea Roxb. ex Lindl.; Cassia robinioides Willd.; Cassia ruscifolia Jacq.; Cassia socotrana Serrato; Cassia sophera L.; Cassia sopheroides Collad.; Cassia torosa Cav.; Cassia torulosa Poir.; Chamaefistula chinensis G.Don; Chamaefistula coromandelina (Jacq.) G.Don; Chamaefistula sophera (L.) G.Don; Chamaefistula torosa (Cav.) G.Don; Ditremexa sophera (L.) Britton & Rose; Octelisia aurea Raf.; Senna esculenta Roxb.; Senna lanceolata Link; Senna officinalis Gaertn.; Senna purpurea Roxb.; Senna socotrana (Serrato) Lock

= Senna sophera =

Species of legume

Senna sophera is a shrub or tree in the bean family Fabaceae. It is now widespread in tropical and subtropical regions of the world, but is believed to be native to tropical America. Originally described by Carl Linnaeus in 1753 as Cassia sophera, it has acquired a large number of synonyms. Vernacular names include algarrobilla, baner, kasunda, kasaundi (Hindi) and kolkasunda (Bengali).

== Description ==
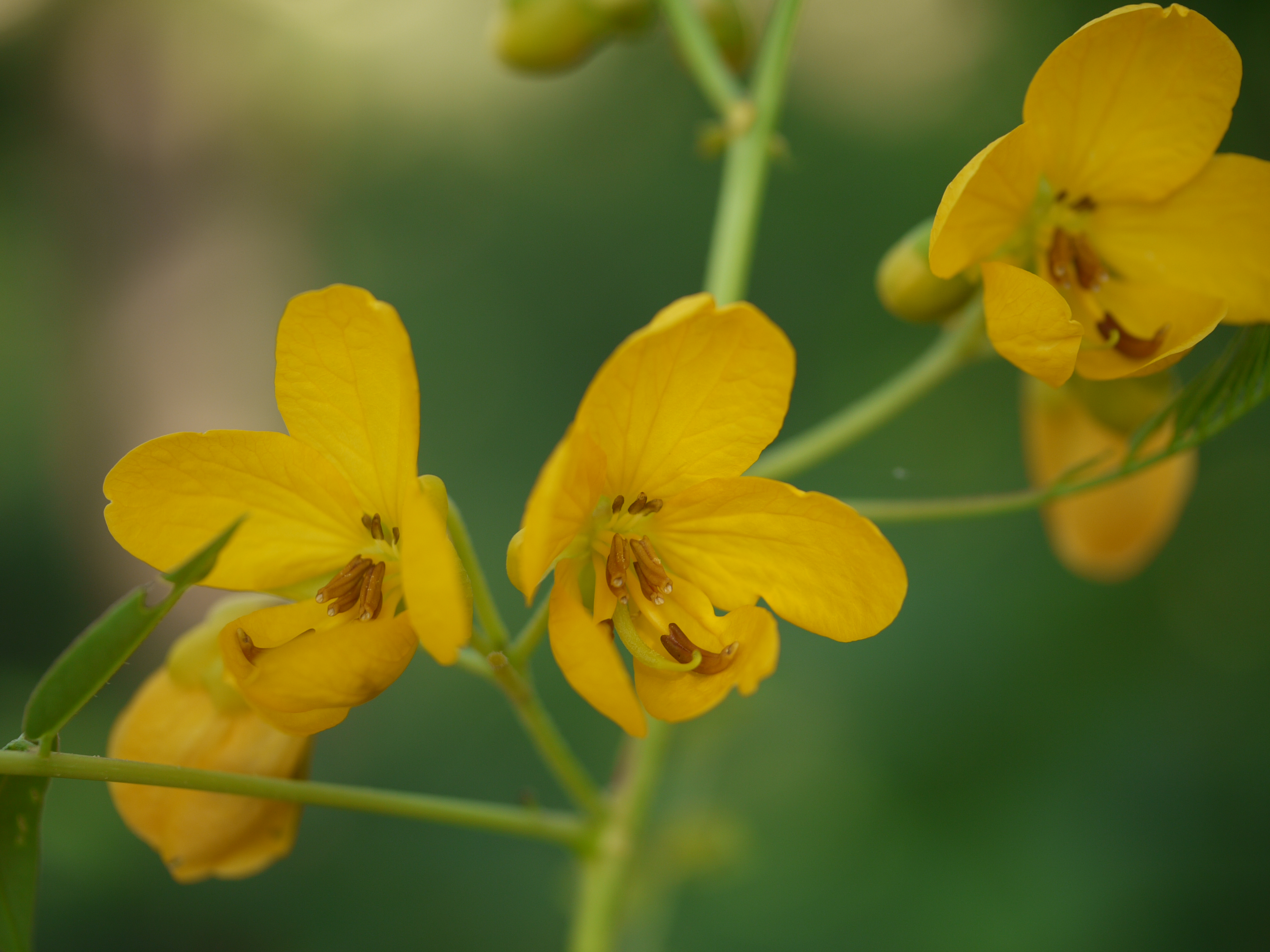
Flower

Senna sophera is a shrub or small tree, glabrous, about 3 m in height. The compound leaves have 8-12 paired leaflets that are acute and tapering. It has yellow flowers in corymbose racemes.

== Distribution ==
Senna sophera is widespread in tropical and subtropical regions of the world, but is considered by Plants of the World Online to be native to the Caribbean (Aruba, the Bahamas, Cuba, the Dominican Republic, Haiti, Jamaica, the Leeward Islands, the Netherlands Antilles, Puerto Rico, Trinidad and Tobago and the Windward Islands); Central America (Belize and Panama); and Guyana in northern South America.

== Conservation ==
Senna socotrana was assessed as "least concern" for the 2004 IUCN Red List, where it is said to be native only to Socotra. As of April 2023, S. socotrana was regarded as a synonym of Senna sophera, which has a very much wider distribution.
