= List of moths of Australia (Tortricidae) =

Partial list of Australian moths

This is a list of the Australian moth species of the family Tortricidae. It also acts as an index to the species articles and forms part of the full List of moths of Australia.

== Chlidanotinae ==
=== Chlidanotini ===
- Caenognosis incisa Walsingham, 1900
- Daulocnema epicharis Common, 1965
- Leurogyia peristictum Common, 1965
- Trymalitis climacias Meyrick, 1911
- Trymalitis optima Meyrick, 1911

=== Hilarographini ===
- Thaumatographa pampoecila (Turner, 1913)

=== Polyorthini ===
- Apura xanthosoma Turner, 1916
- Polylopha epidesma Lower, 1901
- Polylopha phaeolopha (Turner, 1925)

== Olethreutinae ==
=== Bactrini ===
- Bactra ablabes Turner, 1946
- Bactra anthracosema Turner, 1916
- Bactra blepharopis Meyrick, 1911
- Bactra capnopepla Turner, 1946
- Bactra opatanias Meyrick, 1911
- Bactra psammitis Turner, 1916
- Bactra scalopias Meyrick, 1911
- Bactra testudinea Turner, 1916
- Bactra venosana (Zeller, 1847)
- Bactra xuthochyta (Turner, 1945)
- Endothenia polymetalla (Turner, 1916)
- Syntozyga anconia (Meyrick, 1911)
- Syntozyga psammetalla Lower, 1901
- Syntozyga sedifera (Meyrick, 1911)

=== Enarmoniini ===
- Aglaogonia eupena (Turner, 1946)
- Aglaogonia historica (Meyrick, 1920)
- Anathamna plana Meyrick, 1911
- Ancyclophyes monochroa Diakonoff, 1984
- Ancylis acromochla (Turner, 1946)
- Ancylis anguillana (Meyrick, 1881)
- Ancylis argillacea (Turner, 1916)
- Ancylis artifica (Meyrick, 1911)
- Ancylis biscissana (Meyrick, 1881)
- Ancylis carpalima Meyrick, 1911
- Ancylis colonota (Meyrick, 1911)
- Ancylis coronopa (Meyrick, 1911)
- Ancylis erythrana (Meyrick, 1881)
- Ancylis erythrosema (Turner, 1945)
- Ancylis fidana (Meyrick, 1881)
- Ancylis hibbertiana (Meyrick, 1881)
- Ancylis himerodana (Meyrick, 1881)
- Ancylis infectana (Meyrick, 1881)
- Ancylis longestriata (Durrant, 1891)
- Ancylis mesoscia (Meyrick, 1911)
- Ancylis ochropepla (Turner, 1926)
- Ancylis phileris (Meyrick, 1910)
- Ancylis pseustis (Meyrick, 1911)
- Ancylis sciodelta (Meyrick, 1921)
- Ancylis segetana (Meyrick, 1881)
- Ancylis stilpna (Turner, 1925)
- Ancylis synomotis (Meyrick, 1911)
- Ancylis volutana (Meyrick, 1881)
- Anthozela hilaris (Turner, 1916)
- Balbidomaga uptoni Horak, 2006
- Cyphophanes gracilivalva Horak, 2006
- Eucosmogastra miltographa (Meyrick, 1907)
- Eucosmogastra poetica (Meyrick, 1909)
- Eucosmogastra pyrrhopa (Lower, 1896)
- Helictophanes myrolychna (Turner, 1946)
- Helictophanes prospera (Meyrick, 1909)
- Helictophanes scambodes (Meyrick, 1911)
- Helictophanes uberana Meyrick, 1881
- Irianassa aetheria (Turner, 1946)
- Loboschiza delomilta (Turner, 1946)
- Loboschiza deloxantha (Turner, 1946)
- Loboschiza exemplaris (Meyrick, 1911)
- Loboschiza furiosa (Meyrick, 1921)
- Loboschiza hemicosma (Lower, 1908)
- Loboschiza koenigiana (Fabricius, 1775)
- Loboschiza martia (Meyrick, 1911)
- Loboschiza thoenarcha (Meyrick, 1911)
- Metaselena allophlebodes Horak & Sauter, 1981
- Metaselena lepta Horak & Sauter, 1981
- Oriodryas olbophora Turner, 1925
- Periphoeba trepida (Meyrick, 1911)
- Pseudancylis acrogypsa (Turner, 1916)
- Pternidora phloeotis Meyrick, 1911
- Tetramoera gracilistria (Turner, 1946)
- Thysanocrepis crossota (Meyrick, 1911)
- Toonavora aellaea (Turner, 1916)

=== Eucosmini ===
- Acroclita bryopa (Meyrick, 1911)
- Coenobiodes melanocosma (Turner, 1916)
- Crocidosema apicinota (Turner, 1946)
- Crocidosema lantana (Busck, 1910)
- Crocidosema plebejana Zeller, 1847
- Eccoptocera australis Horak, 2006
- Epiblema strenuana (Walker, 1863)
- Eucosmophyes commoni Horak, 2006
- Fibuloides minuta Horak, 2006
- Fibuloides phycitipalpia Horak, 2006
- Heleanna chloreis (Turner, 1916)
- Hermenias epidola Meyrick, 1911
- Hermenias rivulifera Turner, 1946
- Herpystis avida Meyrick, 1911
- Holocola aethalostola (Turner, 1946)
- Holocola ammostigma (Turner, 1946)
- Holocola argyrotypa (Turner, 1927)
- Holocola atmophanes (Turner, 1946)
- Holocola baeodes (Turner, 1946)
- Holocola chalcitis (Meyrick, 1911)
- Holocola chlidana (Turner, 1927)
- Holocola deloschema (Turner, 1914)
- Holocola ebenostigma (Turner, 1946)
- Holocola fluidana (Meyrick, 1881)
- Holocola honesta (Meyrick, 1911)
- Holocola hypomolybda (Turner, 1927)
- Holocola imbrifera (Meyrick, 1911)
- Holocola ischalea (Meyrick, 1911)
- Holocola liturata (Turner, 1925)
- Holocola lucifera (Turner, 1946)
- Holocola melanographa (Turner, 1916)
- Holocola morosa (Meyrick, 1911)
- Holocola niphosticha (Turner, 1946)
- Holocola nitida (Turner, 1946)
- Holocola notosphena (Turner, 1946)
- Holocola obeliscana (Meyrick, 1881)
- Holocola opsia (Meyrick, 1911)
- Holocola pellopis (Turner, 1946)
- Holocola peraea (Meyrick, 1911)
- Holocola pericyphana (Meyrick, 1881)
- Holocola periptycha (Turner, 1946)
- Holocola perspectana (Walker, 1863)
- Holocola phaeoscia (Turner, 1916)
- Holocola plinthinana (Meyrick, 1881)
- Holocola seditiosana (Meyrick, 1881)
- Holocola sicariana (Meyrick, 1881)
- Holocola sollicitana (Meyrick, 1881)
- Holocola spanistis (Meyrick, 1911)
- Holocola spodostola (Turner, 1946)
- Holocola striphromita (Turner, 1946)
- Holocola tarachodes (Meyrick, 1911)
- Holocola thalassinana Meyrick, 1881
- Holocola tranquilla (Meyrick, 1911)
- Holocola triangulana Meyrick, 1881
- Holocola vitiosa (Meyrick, 1911)
- Holocola zopherana (Meyrick, 1881)
- Icelita indentata (Bradley, 1957)
- Icelita monela Clarke, 1976
- Melanodaedala scopulosana (Meyrick, 1881)
- Noduliferola neothela (Turner, 1916)
- Rhopobota hortaria (Meyrick, 1911)
- Spilonota acrosema (Turner, 1946)
- Spilonota constrictana (Meyrick, 1881)
- Spilonota quietana (Meyrick, 1881)
- Spilonota ruficomana (Meyrick, 1881)
- Strepsicrates dyselia (Turner, 1946)
- Strepsicrates ebenocosma (Turner, 1946)
- Strepsicrates ejectana (Walker, 1863)
- Strepsicrates infensa (Meyrick, 1911)
- Strepsicrates limnephilana (Meyrick, 1881)
- Strepsicrates macropetana (Meyrick, 1881)
- Strepsicrates semicanella (Walker, 1866)
- Strepsicrates sphenophora (Turner, 1946)
- Strepsicrates transfixa (Turner, 1946)
- Tritopterna capyra (Meyrick, 1911)
- Whittonella peltosema (Lower, 1908)

=== Grapholitini ===
- Acanthoclita trichograpta (Meyrick, 1911)
- Apocydia pervicax (Meyrick, 1911)
- Archiphlebia endophaga (Meyrick, 1911)
- Archiphlebia rutilescens (Turner, 1945)
- Commoneria cyanosticha (Turner, 1946)
- Cryptophlebia iridosoma (Meyrick, 1911)
- Cryptophlebia ombrodelta (Lower, 1898)
- Cryptophlebia pallifimbriana Bradley, 1953
- Cryptophlebia rhynchias (Meyrick, 1905)
- Cydia pomonella (Linnaeus, 1758)
- Fulcrifera persinnuata Komai & Horak, 2006
- Grapholita dysaethria Diakonoff, 1982
- Grapholita molesta (Busck, 1916)
- Grapholita amphitorna (Turner, 1916)
- Grapholita antitheta (Meyrick, 1911)
- Grapholita conficitana (Walker, 1863)
- Grapholita floricolana (Meyrick, 1881)
- Grapholita iridescens (Meyrick, 1881)
- Grapholita parvisignana (Meyrick, 1881)
- Grapholita tetrazancla (Turner, 1925)
- Grapholita tornosticha (Turner, 1946)
- Grapholita zapyrana (Meyrick, 1881)
- Gymnandrosoma gonomela (Lower, 1899)
- Ixonympha hyposcopa (Lower, 1905)
- Leguminivora longigula Horak, 2006
- Loranthacydia aulacodes (Lower, 1902)
- Loranthacydia metallocosma (Lower, 1902)
- Loranthacydia multilinea (Turner, 1945)
- Loranthacydia pessota (Meyrick, 1911)
- Loranthacydia sinapichroa (Turner, 1926)
- Microsarotis sanderyi Komai & Horak, 2006
- Notocydia atripunctis (Turner, 1946)
- Notocydia lomacula (Lower, 1899)
- Notocydia niveimacula Komai & Horak, 2006
- Notocydia tephraea (Meyrick, 1911)
- Pammenemina tetramita (Turner, 1925)
- Pammenopsis barbata Komai & Horak, 2006
- Parapammene dyserasta (Turner, 1916)
- Thaumatotibia aclyta (Turner, 1916)
- Thaumatotibia zophophanes (Turner, 1946)

The following species belong to the tribe Grapholitini, but have not been assigned to a genus yet. Given here is the original name given to the species when it was first described:

- Argyroploce angustifascia Turner, 1925
- Grapholita dentatana Walker, 1864
- Sciaphila diffusana Walker, 1864

=== Microcorsini ===
- Collogenes albocingulata Horak, 2006
- Cryptaspasma brachyptycha (Meyrick, 1911)
- Cryptaspasma sordida (Turner, 1945)

=== Olethreutini ===
- Archilobesia drymoptila (Lower, 1920)
- Aterpia protosema (Diakonoff, 1973)
- Atriscripta arithmetica (Meyrick, 1921)
- Cnecidophora ochroptila (Meyrick, 1910)
- Costosa australis Horak, 2006
- Dactylioglypha tonica (Meyrick, 1909)
- Demeijerella chrysoplea (Diakonoff, 1975)
- Diakonoffiana tricolorana (Meyrick, 1881)
- Diakonoffiana vindemians (Meyrick, 1921)
- Dudua aprobola (Meyrick, 1886)
- Dudua iniqua (Meyrick, 1921)
- Dudua phyllanthana (Meyrick, 1881)
- Dudua siderea (Turner, 1916)
- Eremas leucotrigona Turner, 1945
- Eremas tetrarcha (Meyrick, 1920)
- Euobraztsovia chionodelta (Meyrick, 1911)
- Gatesclarkeana tenebrosa (Turner, 1916)
- Gnathmocerodes alphestis (Meyrick, 1921)
- Gnathmocerodes euplectra (Lower, 1908)
- Gnathmocerodes ophiocosma (Turner, 1946)
- Lobesia arescophanes (Turner, 1945)
- Lobesia extrusana (Walker, 1863)
- Lobesia parvulana (Walker, 1863)
- Lobesia peltophora (Meyrick, 1911)
- Lobesia physophora (Lower, 1901)
- Lobesia symploca (Turner, 1926)
- Lobesia transtrifera (Meyrick, 1920)
- Lobesia xylistis (Lower, 1901)
- Megalota helicana (Meyrick, 1881)
- Megalota uncimacula (Turner, 1925)
- Metrioglypha phyllodes (Lower, 1899)
- Metrioglypha thystas (Meyrick, 1911)
- Ophiorrhabda mormopa (Meyrick, 1906)
- Ophiorrhabda mysterica (Turner, 1916)
- Ophiorrhabda phaeosigma (Turner, 1916)
- Oxysemaphora hacobiani Horak, 2006
- Oxysemaphora notialis Horak, 2006
- Podognatha vinculata (Meyrick, 1916)
- Proschistis polyochtha Diakonoff, 1973
- Rhodacra pyrrhocrossa (Meyrick, 1912)
- Sorolopha archimedias (Meyrick, 1912)
- Sorolopha cyclotoma Lower, 1901
- Sorolopha delochlora (Turner, 1916)
- Sorolopha elaeodes (Lower, 1908)
- Sorolopha johngreeni Horak, 2006
- Sorolopha leptochlora (Turner, 1916)
- Statherotis amaeboea (Lower, 1896)
- Statherotis batrachodes (Meyrick, 1911)
- Statherotis euryphaea (Turner, 1916)
- Statherotis pendulata (Meyrick, 1911)
- Sycacantha atactodes (Turner, 1946)
- Sycacantha castanicolor (Turner, 1946)
- Sycacantha exedra (Turner, 1916)
- Sycacantha niphostetha (Turner, 1946)
- Sycacantha placida (Meyrick, 1911)
- Sycacantha sphaerocosmana (Meyrick, 1881)
- Sycacantha symplecta (Turner, 1946)
- Temnolopha mosaica Lower, 1901
- Trachyschistis hians Meyrick, 1921
- Zomariana doxasticana (Meyrick, 1881)

== Tortricinae ==
=== Archipini ===
- Acroceuthes leucozancla (Turner, 1945)
- Acroceuthes metaxanthana (Walker, 1863)
- Aristocosma chrysophilana (Walker, 1863)
- Atelodora agramma Lower, 1900
- Atelodora pelochytana Meyrick, 1881
- Authomaema diemeniana (Zeller, 1877)
- Authomaema pentacosma (Lower, 1900)
- Authomaema rusticata Meyrick, 1922
- Clarana acrita (Turner, 1916)
- Clarana arrosta (Turner, 1945)
- Clarana arrythmodes (Turner, 1946)
- Clarana atristrigana (Meyrick, 1881)
- Clarana clarana (Meyrick, 1881)
- Clarana hyperetana (Meyrick, 1881)
- Clarana parastactis (Meyrick, 1910)
- Clarana thermaterimma (Lower, 1893)
- Constrictana catharia (Turner, 1926)
- Constrictana constrictana (Walker, 1866)
- Constrictana ephedra (Meyrick, 1910)
- Constrictana ischnomorpha (Turner, 1945)
- Constrictana leptospila (Lower, 1901)
- Constrictana montanana (Meyrick, 1881)
- Constrictana notograpta (Meyrick, 1910)
- Constrictana ophthalmias (Meyrick, 1910)
- Constrictana oxygona (Lower, 1899)
- Constrictana plagiomochla (Turner, 1945)
- Cosmoplaca cosmoplaca (Lower, 1903)
- Euryochra cerophanes (Meyrick, 1910)
- Euryochra euryochra (Turner, 1914)
- Euryochra naias (Turner, 1916)
- Glyphidoptera insignana (Meyrick, 1881)
- Glyphidoptera polymita Turner, 1916
- Isochorista acrodesma (Lower, 1902)
- Isochorista chaodes Meyrick, 1910
- Isochorista encotodes Meyrick, 1910
- Isochorista helota Meyrick, 1910
- Isochorista melanocrypta Meyrick, 1910
- Isochorista panaeolana Meyrick, 1881
- Isochorista parmiferana (Meyrick, 1881)
- Isochorista pumicosa Meyrick, 1910
- Isochorista ranulana Meyrick, 1881
- Phryctora deuterastis (Meyrick, 1910)
- Phryctora hedyma (Turner, 1915)
- Phryctora leucobela (Turner, 1945)
- Phryctora phaeosema (Turner, 1945)
- Phryctora phryctora (Meyrick, 1910)
- Phryctora tapinopis (Turner, 1945)
- Rupicolana argyrocosma (Turner, 1925)
- Rupicolana bleptodora (Turner, 1925)
- Rupicolana camacinana (Meyrick, 1882)
- Rupicolana catarrapha (Turner, 1945)
- Rupicolana celatrix (Turner, 1916)
- Rupicolana contortula (Turner, 1927)
- Rupicolana crotala (Meyrick, 1910)
- Rupicolana gnophodryas (Lower, 1902)
- Rupicolana lenoea (Meyrick, 1910)
- Rupicolana mermera (Meyrick, 1910)
- Rupicolana orthias (Meyrick, 1910)
- Rupicolana phosphora (Meyrick, 1910)
- Rupicolana polymicta (Turner, 1927)
- Rupicolana refluana (Meyrick, 1881)
- Rupicolana rupicolana (Meyrick, 1881)
- Rupicolana serena (Meyrick, 1910)
- Rupicolana stereodes (Meyrick, 1910)
- Rupicolana thiopasta (Turner, 1915)
- Rupicolana tribolana (Meyrick, 1881)
- Tarachota adynata (Turner, 1945)
- Tarachota asemantica (Turner, 1927)
- Tarachota ceramica (Lower, 1908)
- Tarachota cnaphalodes (Meyrick, 1910)
- Tarachota dryina (Meyrick, 1910)
- Tarachota eugrapta (Turner, 1927)
- Tarachota hemicosmana (Meyrick, 1881)
- Tarachota leucospila (Lower, 1893)
- Tarachota mersana (Walker, 1863)
- Tarachota multistriata (Turner, 1945)
- Tarachota notopasta (Turner, 1945)
- Tarachota poliobaphes (Turner, 1927)
- Tarachota scaphosema (Turner, 1945)
- Tarachota tarachota (Meyrick, 1910)
- Xenothictis sciaphila (Turner, 1925)
- Acropolitis canana (Walker, 1863)
- Acropolitis canigerana (Walker, 1863)
- Acropolitis ergophora Meyrick, 1910
- Acropolitis excelsa Meyrick, 1910
- Acropolitis hedista (Turner, 1916)
- Acropolitis magnana (Walker, 1863)
- Acropolitis malacodes Meyrick, 1910
- Acropolitis ptychosema Turner, 1927
- Acropolitis rudisana (Walker, 1863)
- Adoxophyes fasciculana (Walker, 1866)
- Adoxophyes heteroidana Meyrick, 1881
- Adoxophyes instillata Meyrick, 1922
- Adoxophyes melichroa (Lower, 1899)
- Adoxophyes panxantha (Lower, 1901)
- Adoxophyes templana (Pagenstecher, 1900)
- Adoxophyes tripselia (Lower, 1908)
- Coeloptera epiloma (Lower, 1902)
- Coeloptera gyrobathra (Turner, 1925)
- Coeloptera vulpina (Turner, 1916)
- Cryptoptila australana (Lewin, 1805)
- Cryptoptila crypsilopha (Turner, 1925)
- Cryptoptila immersana (Walker, 1863)
- Dichelopa achranta Meyrick, 1910
- Dichelopa dichroa Lower, 1901
- Dichelopa loricata Meyrick, 1910
- Dichelopa panoplana (Meyrick, 1881)
- Dichelopa sabulosa Meyrick, 1910
- Dichelopa sciota (Lower, 1916)
- Dichelopa tarsodes Meyrick, 1910
- Epiphyas ammotypa (Turner, 1945)
- Epiphyas ashworthana (Newman, 1856)
- Epiphyas asthenopis (Lower, 1902)
- Epiphyas aulacana (Meyrick, 1881)
- Epiphyas balioptera (Turner, 1916)
- Epiphyas caryotis (Meyrick, 1910)
- Epiphyas cerussata (Meyrick, 1910)
- Epiphyas cetrata Meyrick, 1910
- Epiphyas dotatana (Walker, 1863)
- Epiphyas epichorda (Meyrick, 1910)
- Epiphyas erysibodes (Turner, 1916)
- Epiphyas eucyrta Turner, 1927
- Epiphyas eugramma (Lower, 1899)
- Epiphyas euphara (Turner, 1945)
- Epiphyas euraphodes (Turner, 1916)
- Epiphyas eveleena (Lower, 1916)
- Epiphyas fabricata (Meyrick, 1910)
- Epiphyas flebilis (Turner, 1939)
- Epiphyas haematephora (Turner, 1916)
- Epiphyas haematodes (Turner, 1916)
- Epiphyas hemiphoena (Turner, 1927)
- Epiphyas hyperacria (Turner, 1916)
- Epiphyas iodes (Meyrick, 1910)
- Epiphyas lathraea (Meyrick, 1910)
- Epiphyas liadelpha (Meyrick, 1910)
- Epiphyas loxotoma (Turner, 1927)
- Epiphyas lycodes (Meyrick, 1910)
- Epiphyas lypra (Turner, 1945)
- Epiphyas ocyptera (Meyrick, 1910)
- Epiphyas oresigona (Turner, 1939)
- Epiphyas oriotes (Turner, 1916)
- Epiphyas peloxythana (Meyrick, 1881)
- Epiphyas plastica (Meyrick, 1910)
- Epiphyas postvittana (Walker, 1863)
- Epiphyas pulla (Turner, 1945)
- Epiphyas scleropa (Meyrick, 1910)
- Epiphyas sobrina (Turner, 1945)
- Epiphyas spodota (Meyrick, 1910)
- Epiphyas xylodes (Meyrick, 1910)
- Ericodesma adoxodes (Turner, 1939)
- Ericodesma antilecta (Turner, 1939)
- Ericodesma concordana (Meyrick, 1881)
- Ericodesma indigestana (Meyrick, 1881)
- Ericodesma isochroa (Meyrick, 1910)
- Ericodesma leptosticha (Turner, 1916)
- Ericodesma liquidana (Meyrick, 1881)
- Ericodesma pallida (Turner, 1945)
- Ericodesma spodophanes (Turner, 1945)
- Homona aestivana (Walker, 1866)
- Homona fistulata Meyrick, 1910
- Homona mermerodes Meyrick, 1910
- Homona spargotis Meyrick, 1910
- Homona trachyptera Diakonoff, 1941
- Isodemis serpentiana Walker, 1863
- Isotenes miserana (Walker, 1863)
- Merophyas calculata (Meyrick, 1910)
- Merophyas divulsana (Walker, 1863)
- Merophyas immersana (Walker, 1863)
- Merophyas petrochroa (Lower, 1908)
- Merophyas scandalota (Meyrick, 1910)
- Merophyas siniodes (Turner, 1945)
- Merophyas tenuifascia Turner, 1927
- Merophyas therina (Meyrick, 1910)
- Neocalyptis molesta (Meyrick, 1910)
- Procalyptis oncota Meyrick, 1910
- Procalyptis parooptera (Turner, 1925)
- "Sobriana" alysidina (Turner, 1927)
- "Sobriana" arcaria (Meyrick, 1910)
- "Sobriana" dyschroa (Turner, 1927)
- "Sobriana" haplopolia (Turner, 1939)
- "Sobriana" mnemosynana (Meyrick, 1881)
- "Sobriana" ophiodesma (Lower, 1902)
- "Sobriana" oressinoma (Turner, 1925)
- "Sobriana" sobriana (Walker, 1863)
- "Sobriana" stigmatias (Meyrick, 1910)
- "Standishana" concolorana (Meyrick, 1881)
- "Standishana" standishana (Newman, 1856)
- "Technitis" agrypna (Meyrick, 1910)
- "Technitis" amoenana (Walker, 1863)
- "Technitis" campylosema (Turner, 1945)
- "Technitis" campylosticha (Turner, 1939)
- "Technitis" cataractis (Meyrick, 1910)
- "Technitis" desmotana (Meyrick, 1881)
- "Technitis" eusticha (Turner, 1945)
- "Technitis" humerellus (Walker, 1866)
- "Technitis" hydractis (Meyrick, 1910)
- "Technitis" oriarcha (Meyrick, 1910)
- "Technitis" phaeoneura (Turner, 1945)
- "Technitis" polyphrica (Turner, 1927)
- "Technitis" procapna (Turner, 1945)
- "Technitis" technica (Turner, 1939)
- "Technitis" technitis (Meyrick, 1910)
- "Technitis" telephanta (Meyrick, 1910)
- "Technitis" tephrodes (Turner, 1916)
- "Technitis" tessulatana (Meyrick, 1881)
- Thrincophora cinefacta (Turner, 1945)
- Thrincophora dryinodes (Meyrick, 1910)
- Thrincophora impletana (Walker, 1863)
- Thrincophora inconcisana (Walker, 1863)
- Thrincophora lignigerana (Walker, 1863)
- Thrincophora signigerana (Walker, 1863)
- Thrincophora stenoptycha (Turner, 1926)

The following species appear to belong to the tribe Archipini, but are in need of further revision to re-evaluate placement. Given below is the original combination (protonym) when first described:

- Anisogona placoxantha Lower, 1896
- Apateta cryphia Turner, 1926
- Argyrotoxa pompica Turner, 1925
- Arotrophora chionaula Meyrick, 1910
- Capua belophora Turner, 1945
- Capua castanitis Turner, 1925
- Capua confragosa Meyrick, 1922
- Capua effulgens Meyrick, 1910
- Capua gongylia Turner, 1925
- Capua incorrupta Meyrick, 1922
- Capua leucostacta Meyrick, 1910
- Capua nummulata Meyrick, 1910
- Capua paraloxa Meyrick, 1910
- Capua phellodes Meyrick, 1910
- Capua promiscua Meyrick, 1922
- Capua tetraplasia Turner, 1916
- Conchylis tasmaniana Walker, 1863
- Dichelia cosmopis Lower, 1894
- Procalyptis albanyensis Strand, 1924
- Tortrix coctilis Meyrick, 1922
- Tortrix eucela Meyrick, 1910
- Tortrix haplodes Meyrick, 1910
- Tortrix incompta Turner, 1927
- Tortrix notophaea Turner, 1926
- Tortrix paurozona Lower, 1902
- Tortrix umbratilis Meyrick, 1922

=== Cnephasiini ===
- Arotrophora anemarcha (Lower, 1902)
- Arotrophora arcuatalis (Walker, 1866)
- Arotrophora canthelias Meyrick, 1910
- Arotrophora charistis Meyrick, 1910
- Arotrophora diadela Common, 1963
- Arotrophora ericirra Common, 1963
- Arotrophora euides (Turner, 1927)
- Arotrophora ochraceellus (Walker, 1863)
- Arotrophora siniocosma Turner, 1926
- Drachmobola strigulata Meyrick, 1910
- Mictoneura flexanimana Meyrick, 1881
- Paranepsia amydra Turner, 1916
- Paraphyas callixena Turner, 1927
- Parastranga macrogona Meyrick, 1910
- Peraglyphis aderces Common, 1963
- Peraglyphis anaptis (Meyrick, 1910)
- Peraglyphis aphanta Common, 1963
- Peraglyphis atherista Common, 1963
- Peraglyphis atimana (Meyrick, 1881)
- Peraglyphis chalepa Common, 1963
- Peraglyphis confusana (Walker, 1863)
- Peraglyphis dyscheres Common, 1963
- Peraglyphis epixantha Common, 1963
- Peraglyphis eucrines Common, 1963
- Peraglyphis hemerana (Meyrick, 1882)
- Peraglyphis idiogenes Common, 1963
- Peraglyphis lividana (Meyrick, 1881)
- Peraglyphis scepasta Common, 1963
- Syllomatia pertinax (Meyrick, 1910)
- Syllomatia pirastis (Meyrick, 1910)
- Syllomatia xythopterana (Meyrick, 1881)
- Symphygas nephaula (Meyrick, 1910)
- Taeniarchis catenata (Meyrick, 1910)
- Taeniarchis hestica Common, 1963
- Taeniarchis periorma (Meyrick, 1910)
- Tanychaeta neanthes (Turner, 1933)

The following species appear to belong to the tribe Cnephasiini, but are in need of further revision to re-evaluate placement. Given below is the original combination (protonym) when first described:

- Mictoneura eurypelta Lower, 1920

=== Cochylini ===
- Cochylis atricapitana (Stephens, 1852)
- Eupoecilia acrographa (Turner, 1916)
- Gynnidomorpha mesoxutha Turner, 1916
- Lorita baccharivora Pogue, 1988

=== Epitymbiini ===
- Aeolostoma scutiferana (Meyrick, 1881)
- Anisogona hilaomorpha (Turner, 1926)
- Anisogona mediana (Walker, 1863)
- Anisogona notoplaga (Turner, 1945)
- Anisogona simana Meyrick, 1881
- Anisogona similana (Walker, 1863)
- Anisogona thysanoma (Meyrick, 1910)
- Asthenoptycha conjunctana (Walker, 1863)
- Asthenoptycha craterana (Meyrick, 1881)
- Asthenoptycha encratopis (Meyrick, 1920)
- Asthenoptycha epiglypta Meyrick, 1910
- Asthenoptycha hemicryptana Meyrick, 1881
- Asthenoptycha heminipha (Turner, 1916)
- Asthenoptycha iriodes (Lower, 1898)
- Asthenoptycha sphaltica Meyrick, 1910
- Asthenoptycha sphenotoma (Turner, 1945)
- Asthenoptycha tolmera (Turner, 1945)
- Capnoptycha cavifrons (Turner, 1926)
- Capnoptycha ipnitis (Meyrick, 1910)
- Capnoptycha tholera (Turner, 1925)
- Capnoptycha zostrophora (Turner, 1925)
- Capua intractana (Walker, 1869)
- Debiliana debiliana (Walker, 1863)
- Debiliana pentazona (Lower, 1901)
- Debiliana symphonica (Turner, 1945)
- Disputana disputana (Walker, 1863)
- Epitymbia alaudana Meyrick, 1881
- Epitymbia apatela Horak & Common, 1985
- Epitymbia cosmota (Meyrick, 1887)
- Epitymbia dialepta Horak & Common, 1985
- Epitymbia eudrosa (Turner, 1916)
- Epitymbia eutypa (Turner, 1925)
- Epitymbia isoscelana (Meyrick, 1881)
- Epitymbia passalotana (Meyrick, 1881)
- Epitymbia scotinopa (Lower, 1902)
- Euphona ammochroa (Lower, 1893)
- Euphona decolorana (Walker, 1863)
- Euphona dyslecta (Turner, 1926)
- Euphona euphona (Meyrick, 1910)
- Euphona oxygrammana (Meyrick, 1881)
- Euphona plathanana (Meyrick, 1881)
- Euphona pseudarcha (Meyrick, 1910)
- Fuscicepsana cirrhoptera (Turner, 1927)
- Fuscicepsana fuscicepsana (Walker, 1863)
- Goboea copiosana Walker, 1866
- Meritastis ferrea (Meyrick, 1910)
- Meritastis illucida (Meyrick, 1910)
- Meritastis laganodes (Meyrick, 1910)
- Meritastis lythrodana (Meyrick, 1881)
- Meritastis piperata (Meyrick, 1910)
- Meritastis polygraphana (Walker, 1863)
- Meritastis psarodes (Meyrick, 1910)
- Meritastis pyrosemana (Meyrick, 1881)
- Meritastis trissochorda (Turner, 1916)
- Meritastis umbrosa Meyrick, 1910
- Meritastis ursina (Meyrick, 1910)
- Rhomboceros homogama Meyrick, 1910
- Subfurcatana schematica (Turner, 1927)
- Subfurcatana subfurcatana (Walker, 1863)
- Trychnophylla taractica Turner, 1926
- Vacuana vacuana (Walker, 1863)

The following species belongs to the tribe Epitymbiini, but have not been assigned to a genus yet. Given here is the original name given to the species when it was first described:

- Capua dura Turner, 1945

=== Phricanthini ===
- Phricanthes asperana Meyrick, 1881
- Phricanthes diaphorus Common, 1965
- Phricanthes flexilineana (Walker, 1863)
- Phricanthes peistica Common, 1965
- Scolioplecta allocotus Common, 1965
- Scolioplecta araea Turner, 1916
- Scolioplecta comptana (Walker, 1863)
- Scolioplecta exochus Common, 1965
- Scolioplecta molybdantha Meyrick, 1910
- Scolioplecta ochrophylla Turner, 1916
- Scolioplecta rigida (Meyrick, 1910)

=== Schoenotenini ===
- Cornuticlava aritrana Common, 1965
- Cornuticlava phanera Common, 1965
- Cornuticlava spectralis (Meyrick, 1912)
- Diactenis tryphera Common, 1965
- Epitrichosma anisocausta (Turner, 1916)
- Epitrichosma ceramina Common, 1965
- Epitrichosma crymodes (Turner, 1916)
- Epitrichosma hesperia Common, 1965
- Epitrichosma luteola Diakonoff, 1974
- Epitrichosma metreta Common, 1965
- Epitrichosma neurobapta Lower, 1908
- Epitrichosma phaulera (Turner, 1916)
- Palaeotoma styphelana Meyrick, 1881
- Proselena annosana Meyrick, 1881
- Proselena tenella (Meyrick, 1910)
- Syncratus paroecus Common, 1965
- Syncratus scepanus Common, 1965
- Tracholena dialeuca Common, 1982
- Tracholena homopolia (Turner, 1945)
- Tracholena micropolia (Turner, 1916)
- Tracholena sulfurosa (Meyrick, 1910)

=== Tortricini ===
- Amboyna diapella Common, 1965
- Anameristes cyclopleura (Turner, 1916)
- Asterolepis earina Common, 1965
- Asterolepis glycera (Meyrick, 1910)
- Exeristeboda exeristis (Meyrick, 1910)
