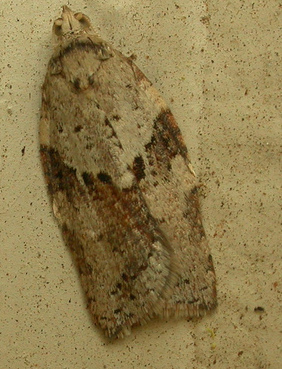
- Epiphyas ashworthana

Scientific classification
- Domain: Eukaryota
- Kingdom: Animalia
- Phylum: Arthropoda
- Class: Insecta
- Order: Lepidoptera
- Family: Tortricidae
- Tribe: Archipini
- Genus: Epiphyas; Turner, 1927

Synonyms
- Austerotortrix Razowski, 1977; Austrotortrix Bradley, 1956

= Epiphyas =

Genus of tortrix moths

Epiphyas is a genus of moths of the family Tortricidae in the tribe Archipini.

== Species ==
- Epiphyas ammotypa (Turner, 1945)
- Epiphyas ashworthana (Newman, 1856)
- Epiphyas asthenopis (Lower, 1902)
- Epiphyas aulacana (Meyrick, 1881)
- Epiphyas balioptera (Turner, 1916)
- Epiphyas caryotis (Meyrick, 1910)
- Epiphyas cerussata (Meyrick, 1910)
- Epiphyas cetrata (Meyrick, 1910)
- Epiphyas dotatana (Walker, 1863)
- Epiphyas epichorda (Meyrick, 1910)
- Epiphyas erysibodes (Turner, 1916)
- Epiphyas eucyrta Turner, 1926
- Epiphyas eugramma (Lower, 1899)
- Epiphyas euphara (Turner, 1945)
- Epiphyas euraphodes (Turner, 1916)
- Epiphyas eveleena (Lower, 1916)
- Epiphyas fabricata (Meyrick, 1910)
- Epiphyas flebilis (Turner, 1939)
- Epiphyas haematephora (Turner, 1916)
- Epiphyas haematodes (Turner, 1916)
- Epiphyas hemiphoena (Turner, 1927)
- Epiphyas hyperacria (Turner, 1916)
- Epiphyas iodes (Meyrick, 1910)
- Epiphyas lathraea (Meyrick, 1910)
- Epiphyas liadelpha (Meyrick, 1910)
- Epiphyas loxotoma (Turner, 1927)
- Epiphyas lycodes (Meyrick, 1910)
- Epiphyas lypra (Turner, 1945)
- Epiphyas ocyptera (Meyrick, 1910)
- Epiphyas oresigona (Turner, 1939)
- Epiphyas oriotes (Turner, 1916)
- Epiphyas peloxythana (Meyrick, 1881)
- Epiphyas plastica (Meyrick, 1910)
- Epiphyas postvittana (Walker, 1863)
- Epiphyas pulla (Turner, 1945)
- Epiphyas scleropa (Meyrick, 1910)
- Epiphyas sobrina (Turner, 1945)
- Epiphyas spodota (Meyrick, 1910)
- Epiphyas xylodes (Meyrick, 1910)

== Former species ==
- Epiphyas chlidana Turner, 1926

== See also ==
- List of Tortricidae genera
