= Atelodora =

Scientific classification
- Domain: Eukaryota
- Kingdom: Animalia
- Phylum: Arthropoda
- Class: Insecta
- Order: Lepidoptera
- Family: Tortricidae
- Tribe: Archipini
- Genus: Atelodora; Meyrick, 1881

Genus of tortrix moths

Atelodora is a genus of moths belonging to the subfamily Tortricinae of the family Tortricidae.

== Species ==
- Atelodora agramma Lower, 1900
- Atelodora pelochytana Meyrick, 1881

== See also ==
- List of Tortricidae genera
