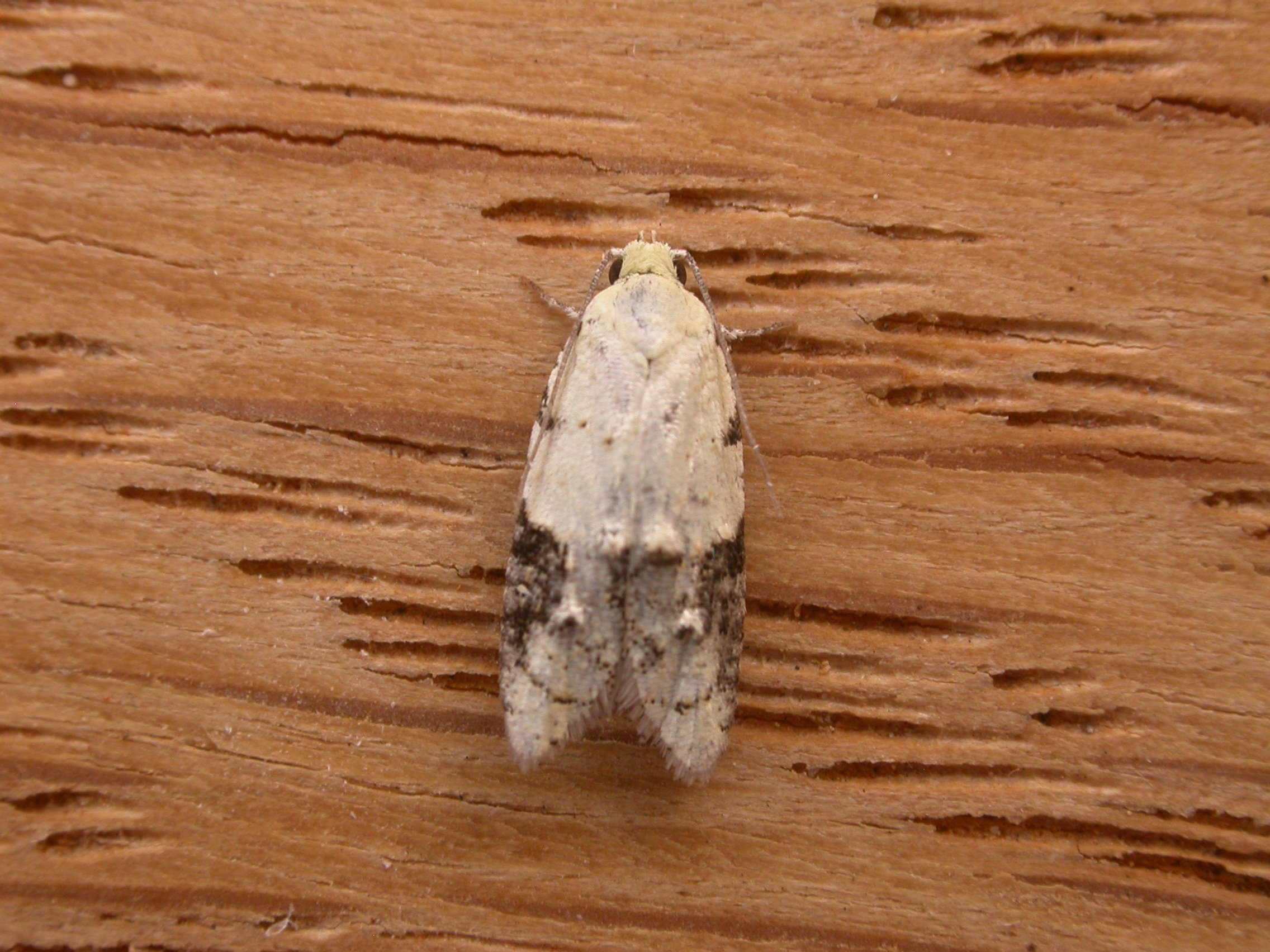
- Tracholena sulfurosa

Scientific classification
- Domain: Eukaryota
- Kingdom: Animalia
- Phylum: Arthropoda
- Class: Insecta
- Order: Lepidoptera
- Family: Tortricidae
- Tribe: Schoenotenini
- Genus: Tracholena; Common, 1965

= Tracholena =

Genus of moths

Tracholena is a genus of moths belonging to the subfamily Tortricinae of the family Tortricidae.

== Species ==
- Tracholena dialeuca Common, 1982
- Tracholena hedraea Common, 1982
- Tracholena homopolia (Turner, 1945)
- Tracholena indicata Diakonoff, 1973
- Tracholena lipara Common, 1973
- Tracholena liparodes Dugdale, 2005
- Tracholena micropolia (Turner, 1916)
- Tracholena nigrilinea Dugdale, 2005
- Tracholena paniense Dugdale, 2005
- Tracholena sulfurosa (Meyrick, 1910)

== See also ==
- List of Tortricidae genera
