= Authomaema =

Scientific classification
- Domain: Eukaryota
- Kingdom: Animalia
- Phylum: Arthropoda
- Class: Insecta
- Order: Lepidoptera
- Family: Tortricidae
- Tribe: Archipini
- Genus: Authomaema; Turner, 1916

Synonyms
- Automaema Obraztsov, 1967

Genus of tortrix moths

Authomaema is a genus of moths belonging to the subfamily Tortricinae of the family Tortricidae.

== Species ==
- Authomaema diemeniana (Zeller, 1877)
- Authomaema pentacosma (Lower, 1900)
- Authomaema rusticata Meyrick, 1922

== See also ==
- List of Tortricidae genera
