= Palaeotoma =

Scientific classification
- Kingdom: Animalia
- Phylum: Arthropoda
- Class: Insecta
- Order: Lepidoptera
- Family: Tortricidae
- Tribe: Schoenotenini
- Genus: Palaeotoma; Meyrick, 1881

Synonyms
- Trachyptila Turner, 1916

Genus of moths

Palaeotoma is a genus of moths belonging to the subfamily Tortricinae of the family Tortricidae.

== Species ==
- Palaeotoma styphelana Meyrick, 1881

== See also ==
- List of Tortricidae genera
