= Anameristes doryphora =

Scientific classification
- Domain: Eukaryota
- Kingdom: Animalia
- Phylum: Arthropoda
- Class: Insecta
- Order: Lepidoptera
- Family: Tortricidae
- Genus: Anameristes
- Species: A. doryphora

Binomial name
- Anameristes doryphora (Liu & Bai, 1986)

Synonyms
- Eboda doryphora Liu & Bai, 1986

Species of moth

Anameristes doryphora is a species of moth of the family Tortricidae. It is found in China (Hainan).
