= Diakonoffiana =

Scientific classification
- Domain: Eukaryota
- Kingdom: Animalia
- Phylum: Arthropoda
- Class: Insecta
- Order: Lepidoptera
- Family: Tortricidae
- Tribe: Olethreutini
- Genus: Diakonoffiana; Kocak, 1981

Genus of tortrix moths

Diakonoffiana is a genus of moths belonging to the subfamily Olethreutinae of the family Tortricidae.

== Species ==
- Diakonoffiana cyanitis (Diakonoff, 1973)
- Diakonoffiana cyanosticha (Clarke, 1976)
- Diakonoffiana mataea (Diakonoff, 1973)
- Diakonoffiana saloris (Diakonoff, 1973)
- Diakonoffiana spumans (Diakonoff, 1973)
- Diakonoffiana syngena (Diakonoff, 1973)
- Diakonoffiana tricolorana (Meyrick, 1881)
- Diakonoffiana vindemians (Meyrick, 1921)

== See also ==
- List of Tortricidae genera
