= Exeristeboda =

Scientific classification
- Domain: Eukaryota
- Kingdom: Animalia
- Phylum: Arthropoda
- Class: Insecta
- Order: Lepidoptera
- Family: Tortricidae
- Tribe: Tortricini
- Genus: Exeristeboda; Razowski, 1990

Genus of tortrix moths

Exeristeboda is a genus of moths belonging to the family Tortricidae.

== Species ==
- Exeristeboda chlorocosma (Turner, 1925)
- Exeristeboda exeristis (Meyrick, 1910)

== See also ==
- List of Tortricidae genera
