= Zomariana =

Scientific classification
- Kingdom: Animalia
- Phylum: Arthropoda
- Class: Insecta
- Order: Lepidoptera
- Family: Tortricidae
- Tribe: Olethreutini
- Genus: Zomariana; Diakonoff, 1984

Genus of tortrix moths

Zomariana is a genus of moths belonging to the subfamily Olethreutinae of the family Tortricidae.

== Species ==
- Zomariana carnicolor (Meyrick, 1931)
- Zomariana doxasticana Meyrick, 1881

== See also ==
- List of Tortricidae genera
