= Rhodacra =

Scientific classification
- Domain: Eukaryota
- Kingdom: Animalia
- Phylum: Arthropoda
- Class: Insecta
- Order: Lepidoptera
- Family: Tortricidae
- Tribe: Olethreutini
- Genus: Rhodacra; Diakonoff, 1973

Genus of tortrix moths

Rhodacra is a genus of moths belonging to the subfamily Olethreutinae of the family Tortricidae.

== Species ==
- Rhodacra leptalea Razowski, 2013
- Rhodacra parvusa Kawabe, 1995
- Rhodacra pyrrhocrossa (Meyrick, 1912)
- Rhodacra rupifera (Meyrick, 1909)

== See also ==
- List of Tortricidae genera
