= Exeristeboda chlorocosma =

Scientific classification
- Domain: Eukaryota
- Kingdom: Animalia
- Phylum: Arthropoda
- Class: Insecta
- Order: Lepidoptera
- Family: Tortricidae
- Genus: Exeristeboda
- Species: E. chlorocosma

Binomial name
- Exeristeboda chlorocosma (Turner, 1925)

Synonyms
- Eboda chlorocosma Turner, 1925

Species of moth

Exeristeboda chlorocosma is a species of moth of the family Tortricidae. It is found in Australia, where it has been recorded from New South Wales.

The wingspan is about 16 mm. The forewings are very pale grey with sparse irroration of slightly darker scales. There are a few raised blackish scales about the middle of the disc and an elongate blotch from the base reaching the costa beyond the first prominence, thence broad, narrowing to a point at the commencement of the second prominence. This blotch is bright green, broadly edged with fuscous. There is also a broad fuscous line along the costa and termen throughout. The hindwings are pale grey tinged with green.
