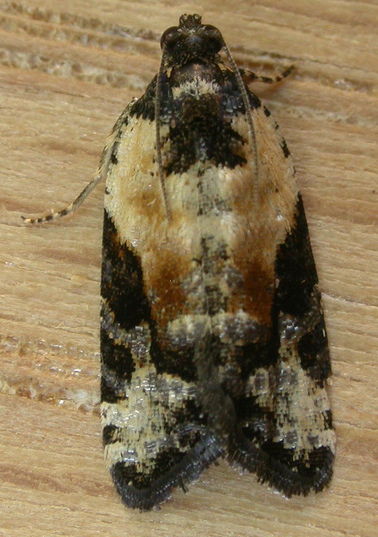
- Asthenoptycha iriodes

Scientific classification
- Domain: Eukaryota
- Kingdom: Animalia
- Phylum: Arthropoda
- Class: Insecta
- Order: Lepidoptera
- Family: Tortricidae
- Subfamily: Tortricinae
- Genus: Asthenoptycha; Meyrick, 1881

= Asthenoptycha =

Genus of tortrix moths

Asthenoptycha is a little-studied genus of moths belonging to the large family Tortricidae. Nearly all known species are native to south-east Australia. Most species are under 20 mm and are well camouflaged, in mottled shades of brown and grey.

== Species ==
- Asthenoptycha conjunctana (Walker, 1863)
- Asthenoptycha craterana (Meyrick, 1881)
- Asthenoptycha encratopis (Meyrick, 1920)
- Asthenoptycha epiglypta Meyrick, 1910
- Asthenoptycha hemicryptana Meyrick, 1881
- Asthenoptycha heminipha (Turner, 1916)
- Asthenoptycha iriodes (Lower, 1898)
- Asthenoptycha sphaltica Meyrick, 1910
- Asthenoptycha sphenotoma (Turner, 1945)
- Asthenoptycha tolmera (Turner, 1945)

== See also ==
- List of Tortricidae genera
