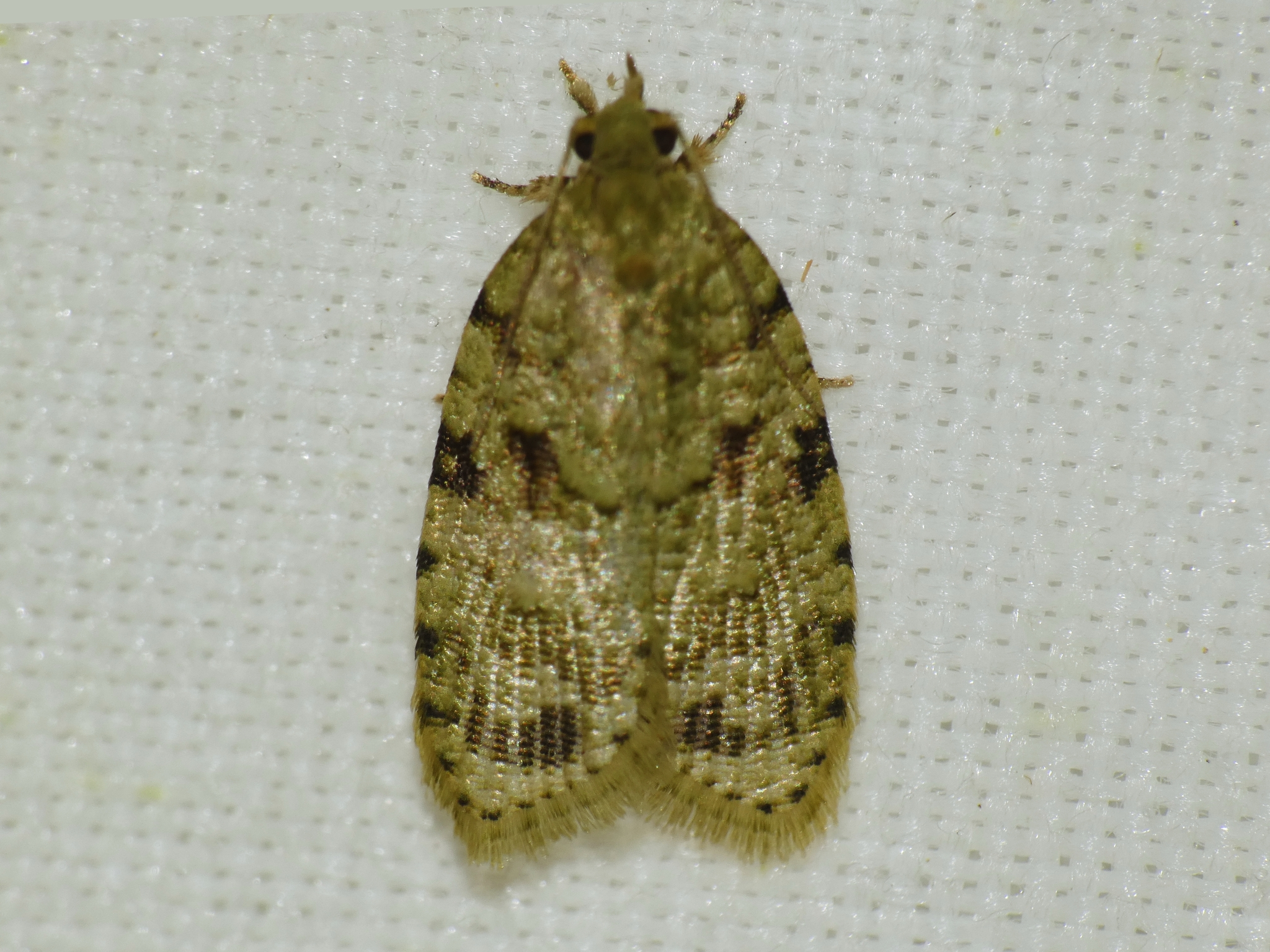
- Epitrichosma luteola

Scientific classification
- Kingdom: Animalia
- Phylum: Arthropoda
- Clade: Pancrustacea
- Class: Insecta
- Order: Lepidoptera
- Family: Tortricidae
- Tribe: Schoenotenini
- Genus: Epitrichosma; Lower, 1908

= Epitrichosma =

Genus of moths

Epitrichosma is a genus of moths belonging to the subfamily Tortricinae of the family Tortricidae.

== Species ==
- Epitrichosma anisocausta (Turner, 1916)
- Epitrichosma argenticola Diakonoff, 1974
- Epitrichosma aureola Diakonoff, 1972
- Epitrichosma ceramina Common, 1965
- Epitrichosma crymodes (Turner, 1916)
- Epitrichosma helioconis (Diakonoff, 1948)
- Epitrichosma hesperia Common, 1965
- Epitrichosma lira Diakonoff, 1972
- Epitrichosma luteola Diakonoff, 1974
- Epitrichosma mellosa (Diakonoff, 1956)
- Epitrichosma metreta Common, 1965
- Epitrichosma neurobapta Lower, 1908
- Epitrichosma phaulera (Turner, 1916)

== See also ==
- List of Tortricidae genera
