= Anameristes =

Scientific classification
- Kingdom: Animalia
- Phylum: Arthropoda
- Class: Insecta
- Order: Lepidoptera
- Family: Tortricidae
- Tribe: Tortricini
- Genus: Anameristes; Common, 1965

Genus of tortrix moths

Anameristes is a genus of moths belonging to the subfamily Olethreutinae of the family Tortricidae.

== Species ==
- Anameristes cyclopleura (Turner, 1916)
- Anameristes doryphora (Liu & Bai, 1986)

== See also ==
- List of Tortricidae genera
