= Rhodacra parvusa =

Scientific classification
- Kingdom: Animalia
- Phylum: Arthropoda
- Class: Insecta
- Order: Lepidoptera
- Family: Tortricidae
- Genus: Rhodacra
- Species: R. parvusa

Binomial name
- Rhodacra parvusa Kawabe, 1995

Species of moth

Rhodacra parvusa is a moth of the family Tortricidae. It is found in Thailand.
