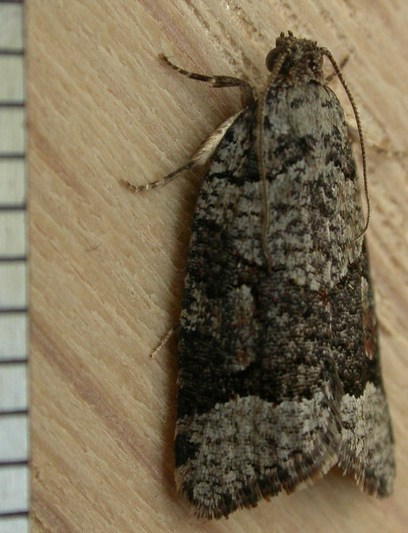
- Meritastis lythrodana

Scientific classification
- Kingdom: Animalia
- Phylum: Arthropoda
- Class: Insecta
- Order: Lepidoptera
- Family: Tortricidae
- Tribe: Epitymbiini
- Genus: Meritastis; Meyrick, 1910

= Meritastis =

Genus of tortrix moths

Meritastis is a genus of moths belonging to the subfamily Tortricinae of the family Tortricidae.

== Species ==
- Meritastis ferrea (Meyrick, 1910)
- Meritastis illucida (Meyrick, 1910)
- Meritastis laganodes (Meyrick, 1910)
- Meritastis lythrodana (Meyrick, 1881)
- Meritastis piperata (Meyrick, 1910)
- Meritastis polygraphana (Walker, 1863)
- Meritastis psarodes (Meyrick, 1910)
- Meritastis pyrosemana (Meyrick, 1881)
- Meritastis trissochorda (Turner, 1916)
- Meritastis umbrosa Meyrick, 1910
- Meritastis ursina (Meyrick, 1910)

== See also ==
- List of Tortricidae genera
