= Aristocosma =

Scientific classification
- Kingdom: Animalia
- Phylum: Arthropoda
- Class: Insecta
- Order: Lepidoptera
- Family: Tortricidae
- Tribe: Archipini
- Genus: Aristocosma; Meyrick, 1881

Type species
- Cacoecia chrysophilana Walker, 1863

Genus of tortrix moths

Aristocosma is a genus of moths belonging to the subfamily Tortricinae of the family Tortricidae.

== Species ==
- Aristocosma chrysophilana (Walker, 1863)

== See also ==
- List of Tortricidae genera
