= Apateta =

Scientific classification
- Kingdom: Animalia
- Phylum: Arthropoda
- Class: Insecta
- Order: Lepidoptera
- Family: Tortricidae
- Subfamily: Tortricinae
- Genus: Apateta; Turner, 1926

Genus of tortrix moths

Apateta is a genus of moths belonging to the subfamily Tortricinae of the family Tortricidae.

== Species ==
- Apateta cryphia Turner, 1926

== See also ==
- List of Tortricidae genera
