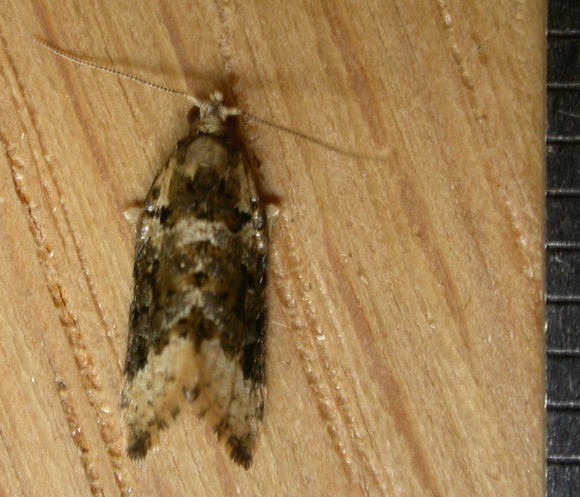
- Aeolostoma scutiferana

Scientific classification
- Kingdom: Animalia
- Phylum: Arthropoda
- Class: Insecta
- Order: Lepidoptera
- Family: Tortricidae
- Subfamily: Tortricinae
- Genus: Aeolostoma; Meyrick, 1910

= Aeolostoma =

Genus of tortrix moths

Aeolostoma is a genus of moths belonging to the subfamily Tortricinae of the family Tortricidae.

== Species ==
- Aeolostoma melanostoecha Diakonoff, 1953
- Aeolostoma orophila Diakonoff, 1953
- Aeolostoma scutiferana (Meyrick, 1881)

== See also ==
- List of Tortricidae genera
