= Rhodacra leptalea =

Scientific classification
- Kingdom: Animalia
- Phylum: Arthropoda
- Class: Insecta
- Order: Lepidoptera
- Family: Tortricidae
- Genus: Rhodacra
- Species: R. leptalea

Binomial name
- Rhodacra leptalea Razowski, 2013

Species of moth

Rhodacra leptalea is a species of moth of the family Tortricidae first described by Józef Razowski in 2013. It is found on Seram Island in Indonesia. The habitat consists of upper montane forests.

The wingspan is about 15 mm.
