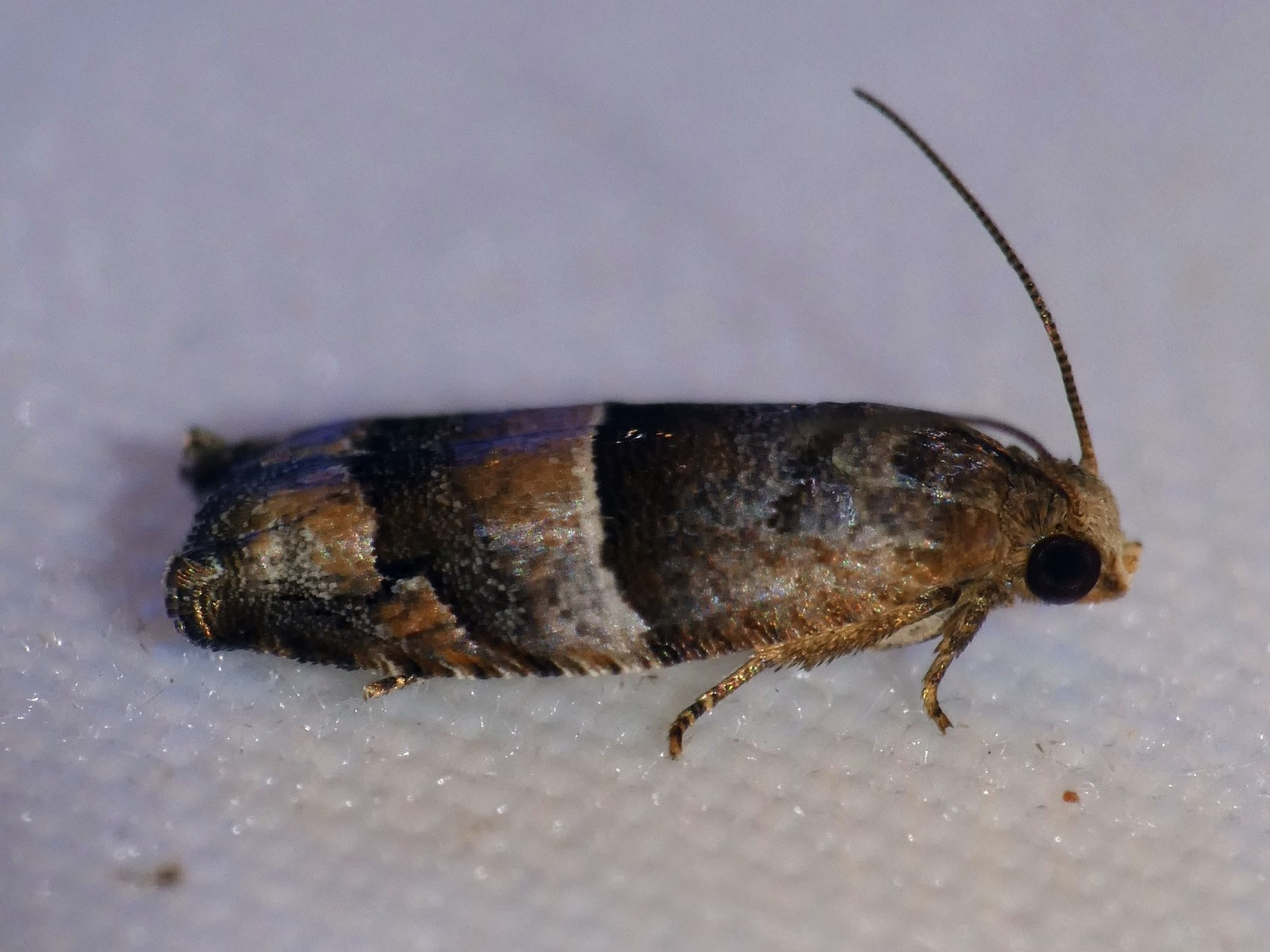
- Icelita indentata

Scientific classification
- Domain: Eukaryota
- Kingdom: Animalia
- Phylum: Arthropoda
- Class: Insecta
- Order: Lepidoptera
- Family: Tortricidae
- Subfamily: Olethreutinae
- Genus: Icelita; Bradley, 1957

= Icelita =

Genus of tortrix moths

Icelita is a genus of moths belonging to the subfamily Olethreutinae of the family Tortricidae.

== Species ==
- Icelita antecellana (Kuznetzov, 1988)
- Icelita cirrholepida Clarke, 1976
- Icelita indentata (Bradley, 1957)
- Icelita monela Clarke, 1976
- Icelita tatarana Bradley, 1957

== See also ==
- List of Tortricidae genera
