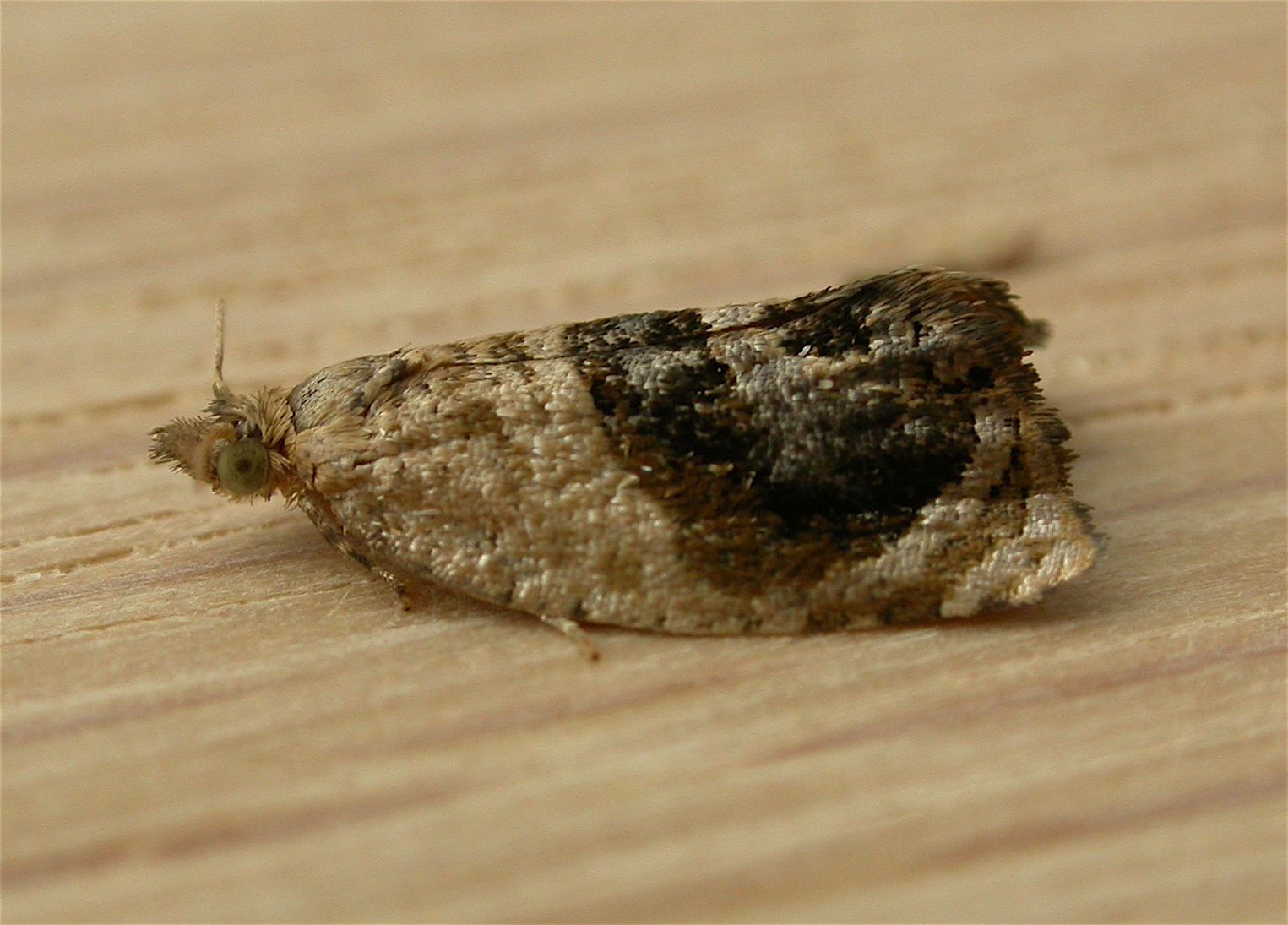
- A female Acroceuthes metaxanthana in Australia.

Scientific classification
- Kingdom: Animalia
- Phylum: Arthropoda
- Class: Insecta
- Order: Lepidoptera
- Family: Tortricidae
- Tribe: Archipini
- Genus: Acroceuthes (Meyrick, 1881)

Synonyms
- Axioprepes (Turner, 1945)

= Acroceuthes =

Genus of tortrix moths

Acroceuthes is a genus of moths belonging to the subfamily Tortricinae of the family Tortricidae.

== Species ==
- Acroceuthes leucozancla (Turner, 1945)
- Acroceuthes metaxanthana (Walker, 1863)

== See also ==
- List of Tortricidae genera
