= Rhodacra pyrrhocrossa =

Scientific classification
- Kingdom: Animalia
- Phylum: Arthropoda
- Class: Insecta
- Order: Lepidoptera
- Family: Tortricidae
- Genus: Rhodacra
- Species: R. pyrrhocrossa

Binomial name
- Rhodacra pyrrhocrossa (Meyrick, 1912)

Synonyms
- Argyroploce pyrrhocrossa Meyrick, 1912; Olethreutes pyrrhocrossa Clarke, 1958

Species of moth

Rhodacra pyrrhocrossa is a moth of the family Tortricidae. It is found in Thailand, Japan, Taiwan, India and Australia.
