= Authomaema rusticata =

Scientific classification
- Kingdom: Animalia
- Phylum: Arthropoda
- Class: Insecta
- Order: Lepidoptera
- Family: Tortricidae
- Genus: Authomaema
- Species: A. rusticata

Binomial name
- Authomaema rusticata Meyrick, 1922

Species of moth

Authomaema rusticata is a species of moth of the family Tortricidae. It is found in Australia, where it has been recorded from Victoria.
