= Epiphyas loxotoma =

Scientific classification
- Domain: Eukaryota
- Kingdom: Animalia
- Phylum: Arthropoda
- Class: Insecta
- Order: Lepidoptera
- Family: Tortricidae
- Genus: Epiphyas
- Species: E. loxotoma

Binomial name
- Epiphyas loxotoma (Turner, 1927)

Synonyms
- Tortrix loxotoma Turner, 1927

Species of moth

Epiphyas loxotoma is a species of moth of the family Tortricidae. It is found in Australia, where it has been recorded from Tasmania. The habitat consists of wet eucalypt forests.

The wingspan is about 27 mm.
