= Anameristes cyclopleura =

Scientific classification
- Domain: Eukaryota
- Kingdom: Animalia
- Phylum: Arthropoda
- Class: Insecta
- Order: Lepidoptera
- Family: Tortricidae
- Genus: Anameristes
- Species: A. cyclopleura

Binomial name
- Anameristes cyclopleura (Turner, 1916)

Synonyms
- Eboda cyclopleura Turner, 1916

Species of moth

Anameristes cyclopleura is a species of moth of the family Tortricidae. It is found in Australia, where it has been recorded from Queensland.

The wingspan is 12–14 mm. The forewings are grey, with transverse fuscous strigulations (fine streaks) and an interrupted purple-fuscous line on the costa. The hindwings are pale grey.
