= Diakonoffiana tricolorana =

Scientific classification
- Kingdom: Animalia
- Phylum: Arthropoda
- Class: Insecta
- Order: Lepidoptera
- Family: Tortricidae
- Genus: Diakonoffiana
- Species: D. tricolorana

Binomial name
- Diakonoffiana tricolorana (Meyrick, 1881)

Synonyms
- Helictophanes tricolorana Meyrick, 1881; Helictophanes fungiferana Meyrick, 1881; Argyroploce intricata Turner, 1916; Eucosma leucatma Turner, 1926; Argyroploce lychnospila Turner, 1946; Metendothenia metacycla Diakonoff, 1973

Species of moth

Diakonoffiana tricolorana is a species of moth of the family Tortricidae. It is found in New Caledonia, New Guinea and Australia, where it has been recorded from New South Wales and Queensland.

The wingspan is about 14 mm. The forewings are ochreous fuscous, with dark fuscous transverse lines and small crests of reddish-ochreous scales. The hindwings are pale reddish ochreous, suffused with fuscous towards the margins.
