= Zomariana doxasticana =

Scientific classification
- Domain: Eukaryota
- Kingdom: Animalia
- Phylum: Arthropoda
- Class: Insecta
- Order: Lepidoptera
- Family: Tortricidae
- Genus: Zomariana
- Species: Z. doxasticana

Binomial name
- Zomariana doxasticana (Meyrick, 1881)

Species of tortrix moth

Zomariana doxasticana is a species of moth of the family Tortricidae. It is found in Australia and sporadically in New Zealand. This species has not been recorded since 1999. It has been hypothesised that it is immigrant that sporadically establishes.

== Host species ==
The larval hosts of this moth are species in the genus Acacia.
