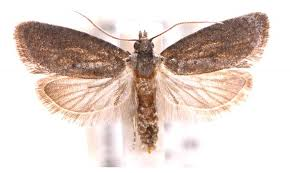

Scientific classification
- Domain: Eukaryota
- Kingdom: Animalia
- Phylum: Arthropoda
- Class: Insecta
- Order: Lepidoptera
- Family: Tortricidae
- Genus: Tracholena
- Species: T. micropolia

Binomial name
- Tracholena micropolia (Turner, 1916)

Synonyms
- Schoenotenes micropolia Turner, 1916

= Tracholena micropolia =

Species of moth

Tracholena micropolia is a species of moth of the family Tortricidae. It is found in Australia, where it has been recorded from Queensland.

The wingspan is about 12 mm. The forewings are whitish grey, strigulated (finely streaked) with pale fuscous. The hindwings are whitish, tinged with grey towards the apex.
