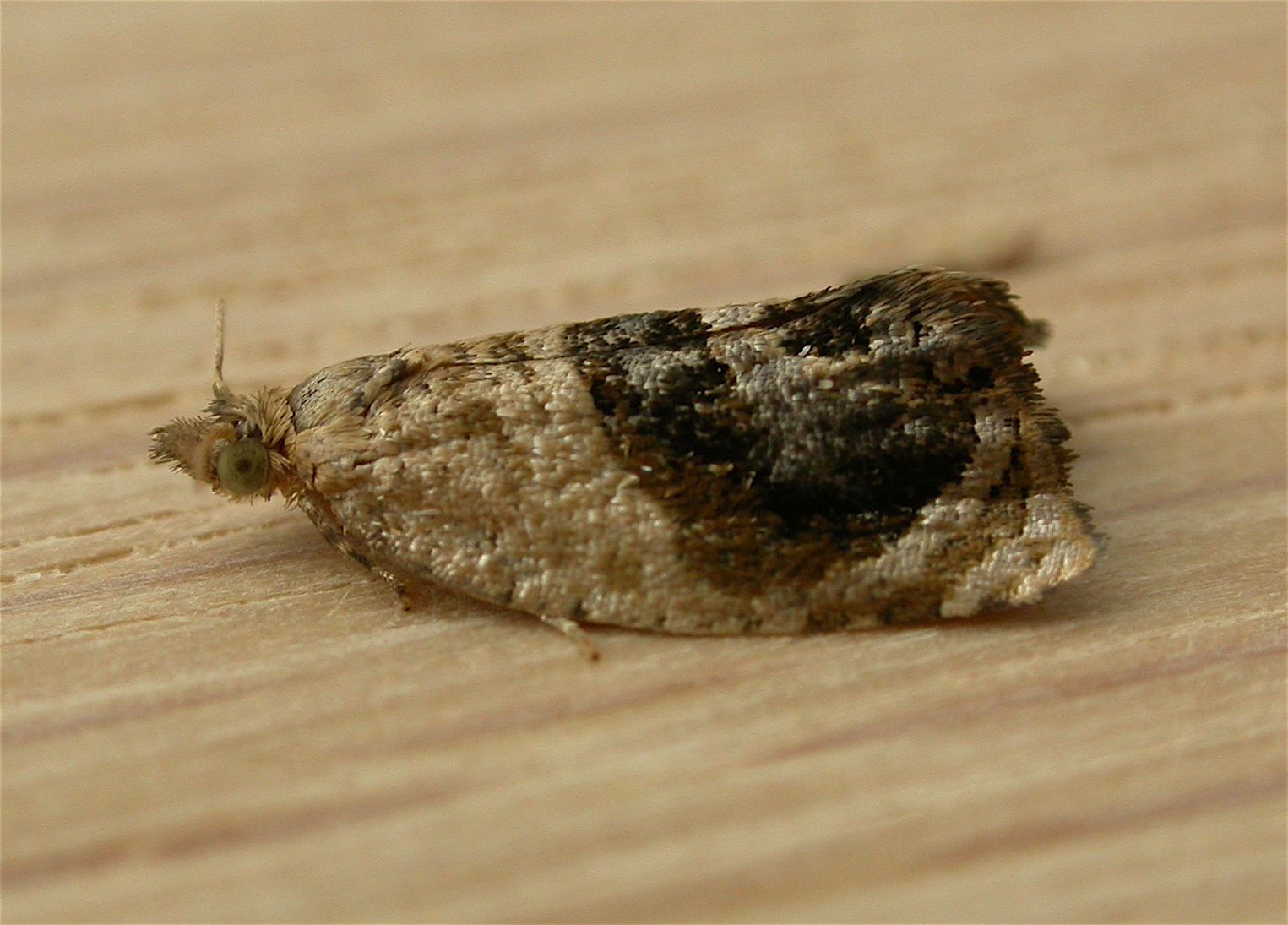
- Female

Scientific classification
- Domain: Eukaryota
- Kingdom: Animalia
- Phylum: Arthropoda
- Class: Insecta
- Order: Lepidoptera
- Family: Tortricidae
- Genus: Acroceuthes
- Species: A. metaxanthana

Binomial name
- Acroceuthes metaxanthana (Walker, 1863)

Synonyms
- Cacoecia metaxanthana (Walker, 1863); Sciaphila projectana (Walker, 1863); Carpocapsa trajectana (Walker, 1864)

= Acroceuthes metaxanthana =

Species of moth

Acroceuthes metaxanthana is a moth of the family Tortricidae. It is found in Australia.

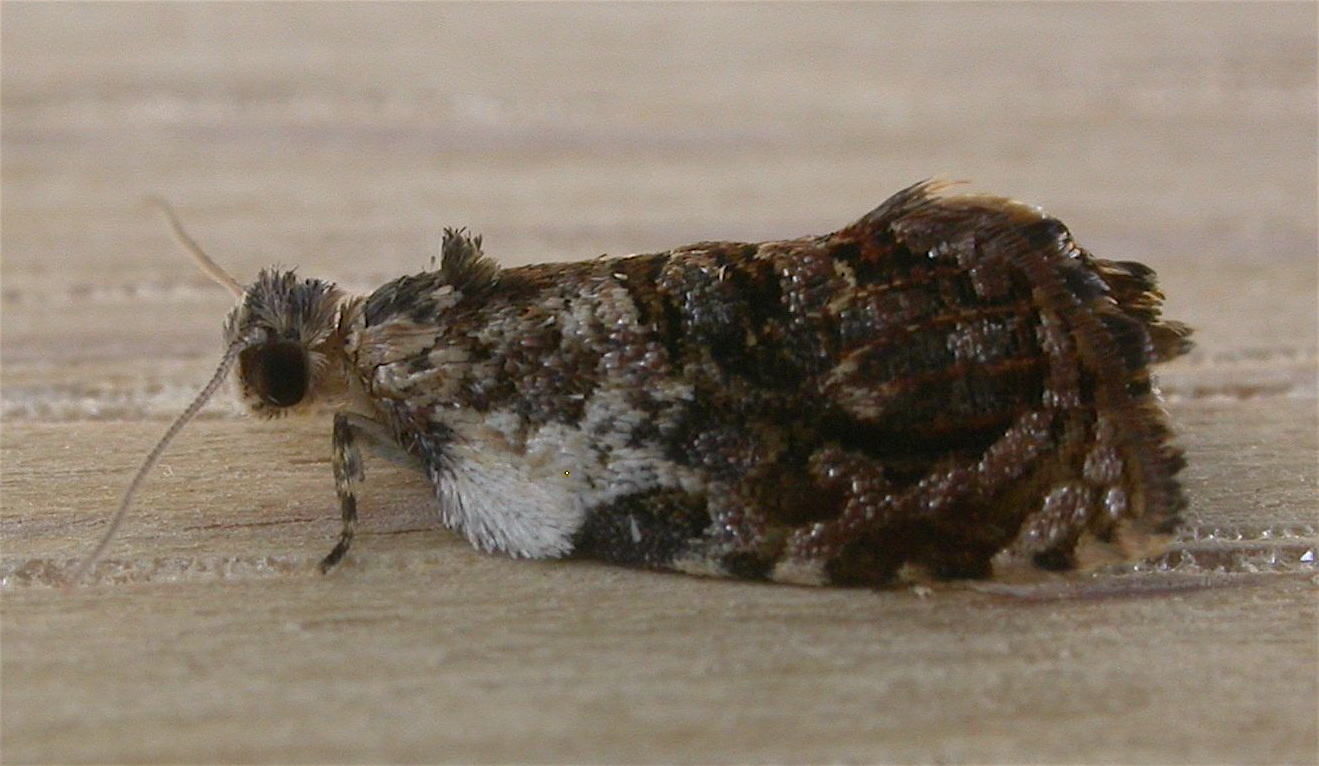
Male
