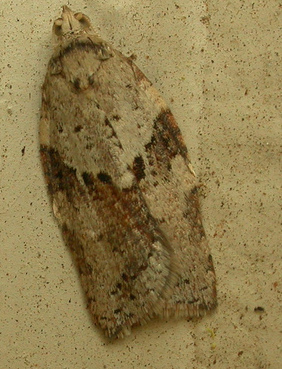

Scientific classification
- Kingdom: Animalia
- Phylum: Arthropoda
- Clade: Pancrustacea
- Class: Insecta
- Order: Lepidoptera
- Family: Tortricidae
- Genus: Epiphyas
- Species: E. ashworthana

Binomial name
- Epiphyas ashworthana (Newman, 1856)

Synonyms
- Tortrix ashworthana Newman, 1856; Tortrix phaeoscia Turner, 1945; Teras responsana Walker, 1863; Pandemis secundana Walker, 1863

= Epiphyas ashworthana =

Species of moth

Epiphyas ashworthana is a moth of the family Tortricidae. It is found in Australia.

The wingspan is about 20 mm.

The larvae feed on Acacia dealbata and Acacia baileyana.
