= Epiphyas balioptera =

Scientific classification
- Domain: Eukaryota
- Kingdom: Animalia
- Phylum: Arthropoda
- Class: Insecta
- Order: Lepidoptera
- Family: Tortricidae
- Genus: Epiphyas
- Species: E. balioptera

Binomial name
- Epiphyas balioptera (Turner, 1916)

Synonyms
- Tortrix balioptera Turner, 1916

Species of moth

Epiphyas balioptera is a species of moth of the family Tortricidae. It is found in Australia, where it has been recorded from Queensland.

The wingspan is about 15 mm (0.59 in). The forewings are whitish, strigulated (finely streaked) with pale ochreous brown. The hindwings are grey whitish, strigulated with grey.
