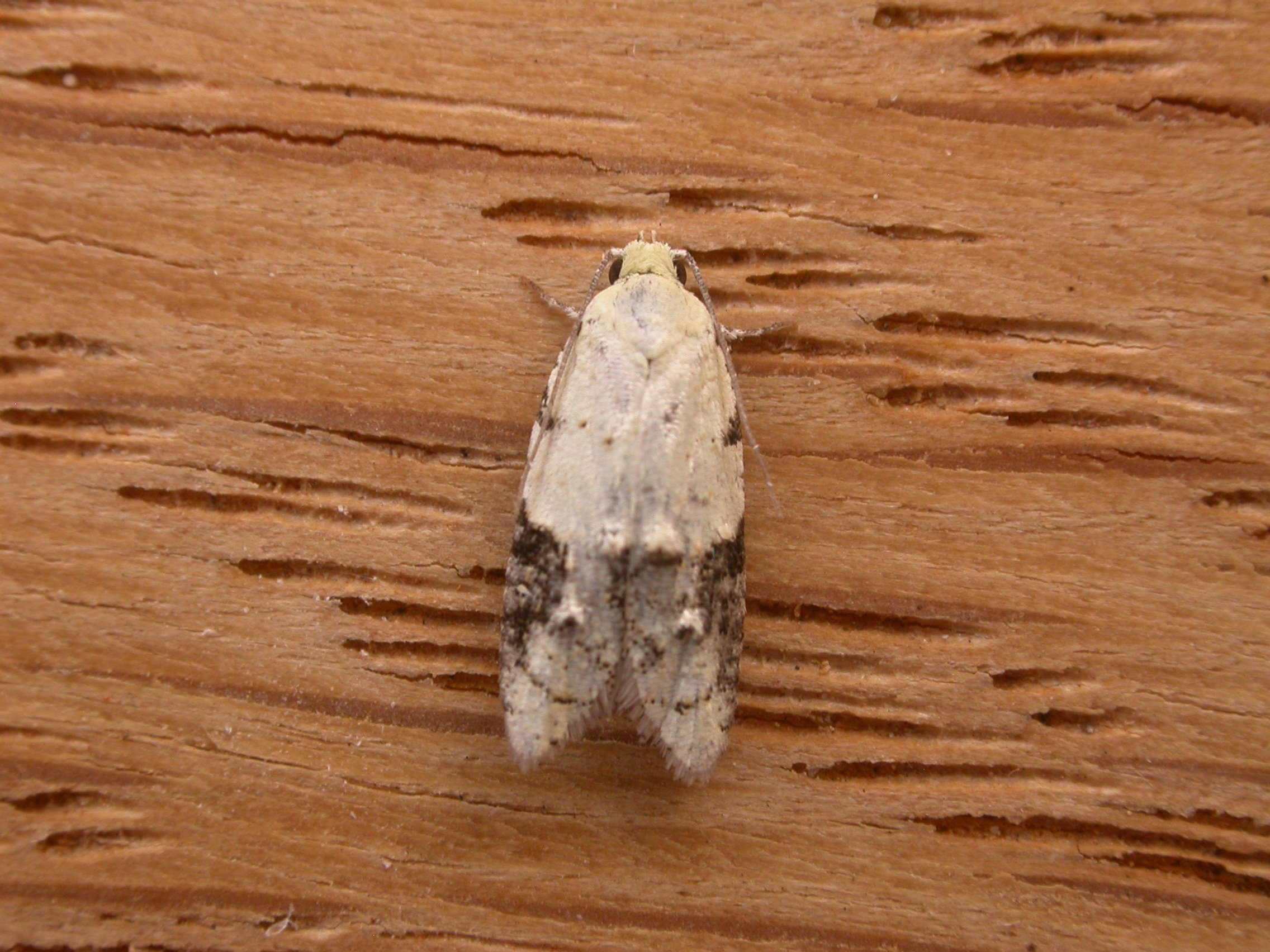

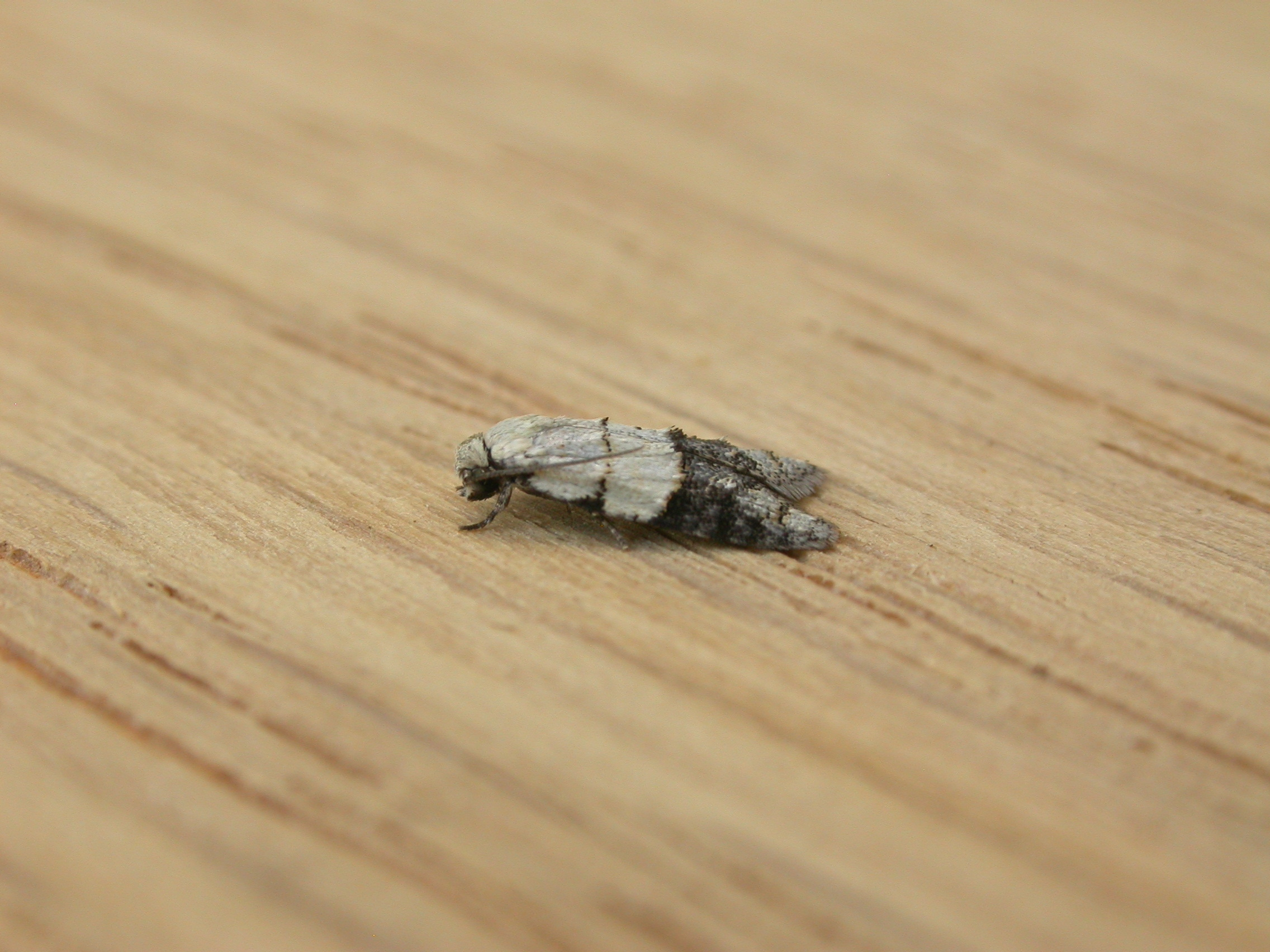

Scientific classification
- Kingdom: Animalia
- Phylum: Arthropoda
- Class: Insecta
- Order: Lepidoptera
- Family: Tortricidae
- Genus: Tracholena
- Species: T. sulfurosa

Binomial name
- Tracholena sulfurosa (Meyrick, 1910)

Synonyms
- Cnephasia sulfurosa Meyrick, 1910

= Tracholena sulfurosa =

Species of moth

Tracholena sulfurosa is a moth of the family Tortricidae. It is known from Australia, including the Australian Capital Territory, Tasmania, Queensland and New South Wales.
