= Epitrichosma anisocausta =

Scientific classification
- Kingdom: Animalia
- Phylum: Arthropoda
- Class: Insecta
- Order: Lepidoptera
- Family: Tortricidae
- Genus: Epitrichosma
- Species: E. anisocausta

Binomial name
- Epitrichosma anisocausta (Turner, 1916)

Synonyms
- Meritastis anisocausta Turner, 1916

Species of moth

Epitrichosma anisocausta is a species of moth of the family Tortricidae. It is found in Australia, where it has been recorded from the Northern Territory.

The wingspan is about 12 mm. The forewings are grey whitish, with a large fuscous basal patch. The hindwings are grey whitish.
