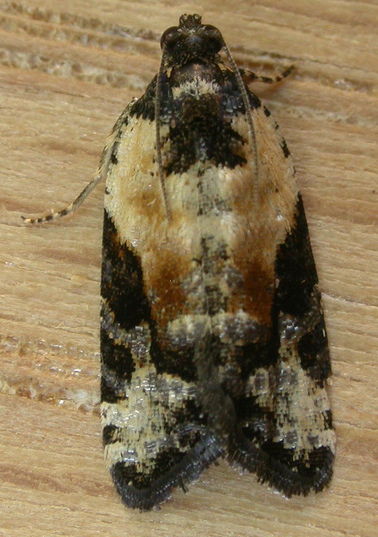

Scientific classification
- Kingdom: Animalia
- Phylum: Arthropoda
- Clade: Pancrustacea
- Class: Insecta
- Order: Lepidoptera
- Family: Tortricidae
- Genus: Asthenoptycha
- Species: A. iriodes

Binomial name
- Asthenoptycha iriodes (Lower, 1898)

Synonyms
- Anatropia iriodes Lower, 1898

= Asthenoptycha iriodes =

Species of moth

Asthenoptycha iriodes is a species of moth of the family Tortricidae. It is found in Australia (New South Wales and Victoria). The wingspan is about 1.5 cm (0.59 in).
