= Epiphyas aulacana =

Scientific classification
- Domain: Eukaryota
- Kingdom: Animalia
- Phylum: Arthropoda
- Class: Insecta
- Order: Lepidoptera
- Family: Tortricidae
- Genus: Epiphyas
- Species: E. aulacana

Binomial name
- Epiphyas aulacana (Meyrick, 1881)

Synonyms
- Tortrix aulacana Meyrick, 1881; Tortrix echinitis Meyrick, 1910

Species of moth

Epiphyas aulacana is a species of moth of the family Tortricidae. It is found in Australia, where it has been recorded from Lord Howe Island, New South Wales, South Australia, Victoria and Tasmania. The habitat consists of open forests where it has been recorded at altitudes between sea level and 300 meters in Tasmania.
