= Asthenoptycha epiglypta =

Scientific classification
- Kingdom: Animalia
- Phylum: Arthropoda
- Class: Insecta
- Order: Lepidoptera
- Family: Tortricidae
- Genus: Asthenoptycha
- Species: A. epiglypta

Binomial name
- Asthenoptycha epiglypta Meyrick, 1910

Synonyms
- Capua eucamata Turner, 1916

Species of moth

Asthenoptycha epiglypta is a species of moth of the family Tortricidae. It is found in Australia, where it has been recorded from Tasmania and Victoria.

The wingspan is about 14 mm. The forewings are fuscous, mixed with whitish and slightly tinged with ferruginous brown. The markings are whitish, edged with dark fuscous and ferruginous brown. The hindwings are grey.
