= Palaeotoma styphelana =

Scientific classification
- Kingdom: Animalia
- Phylum: Arthropoda
- Class: Insecta
- Order: Lepidoptera
- Family: Tortricidae
- Genus: Palaeotoma
- Species: P. styphelana

Binomial name
- Palaeotoma styphelana Meyrick, 1881

Synonyms
- Trachyptila melanosticha Turner, 1916; Trachyptila phaulodes Turner, 1925; Paraselena haplopolia Turner, 1945; Acropolitis melanosticha Turner, 1945; Lamyrodes pellochroa Turner, 1945

Species of moth

Palaeotoma styphelana is a species of moth of the family Tortricidae. It is found in Australia, where it has been recorded from Tasmania, Victoria, Queensland and New South Wales.

The wingspan is about 21 mm. The forewings are whitish grey, with fine blackish strigulae (fine streaks) and irroration (speckling). The hindwings are pale grey.
