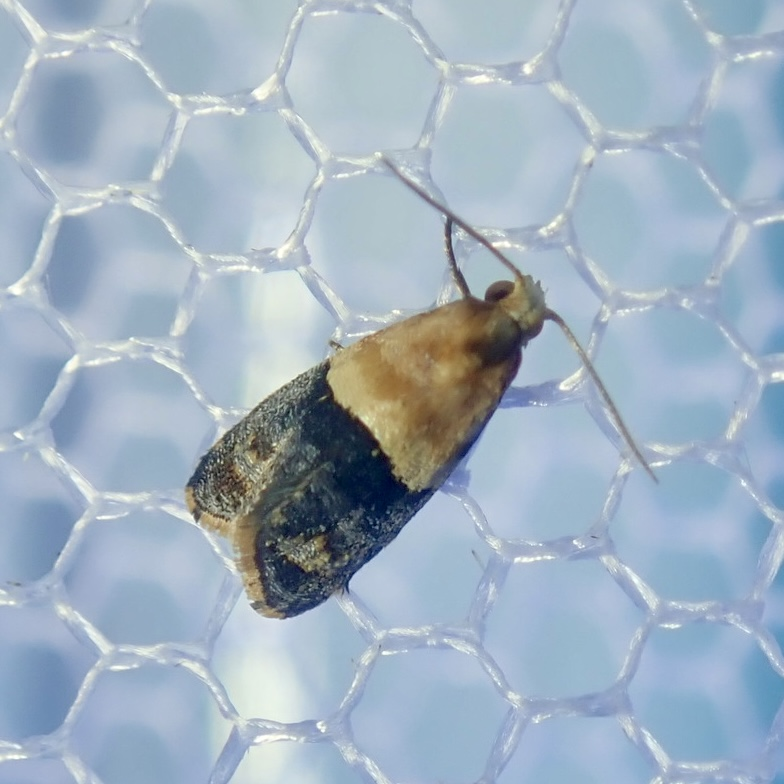

Scientific classification
- Kingdom: Animalia
- Phylum: Arthropoda
- Clade: Pancrustacea
- Class: Insecta
- Order: Lepidoptera
- Family: Tortricidae
- Genus: Authomaema
- Species: A. diemeniana

Binomial name
- Authomaema diemeniana (Zeller, 1877)

Synonyms
- Conchylis diemeniana Zeller, 1877

= Authomaema diemeniana =

Species of moth

Authomaema diemeniana is a species of moth of the family Tortricidae. It is found in Australia, where it has been recorded from Tasmania and New South Wales.
