= Epiphyas ammotypa =

Scientific classification
- Domain: Eukaryota
- Kingdom: Animalia
- Phylum: Arthropoda
- Class: Insecta
- Order: Lepidoptera
- Family: Tortricidae
- Genus: Epiphyas
- Species: E. ammotypa

Binomial name
- Epiphyas ammotypa (Turner, 1945)

Synonyms
- Tortrix ammotypa Turner, 1945

Species of moth

Epiphyas ammotypa is a species of moth of the family Tortricidae. It is found in Australia, where it has been recorded from South Australia.
