= Epiphyas euraphodes =

Scientific classification
- Domain: Eukaryota
- Kingdom: Animalia
- Phylum: Arthropoda
- Class: Insecta
- Order: Lepidoptera
- Family: Tortricidae
- Genus: Epiphyas
- Species: E. euraphodes

Binomial name
- Epiphyas euraphodes (Turner, 1916)

Synonyms
- Tortrix euraphodes Turner, 1916

Species of moth found in Australia

Epiphyas euraphodes is a species of moth of the family Tortricidae. It is found in Australia, where it has been recorded from New South Wales.

The wingspan is 15–16 mm. The forewings are whitish, sometimes with slight patchy pale-ochreous suffusion. The markings are fuscous. The hindwings are grey.
