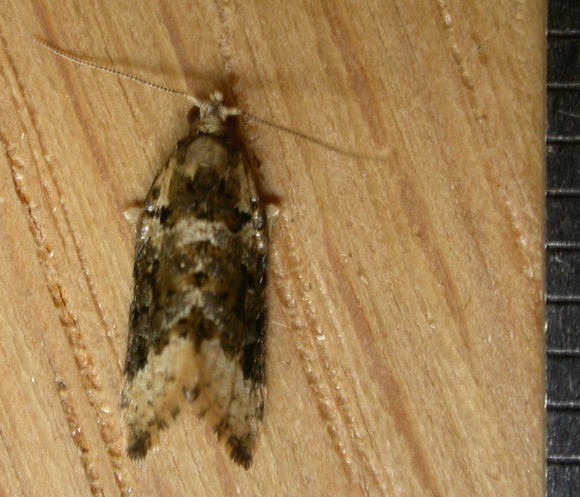

Scientific classification
- Kingdom: Animalia
- Phylum: Arthropoda
- Clade: Pancrustacea
- Class: Insecta
- Order: Lepidoptera
- Family: Tortricidae
- Genus: Aeolostoma
- Species: A. scutiferana

Binomial name
- Aeolostoma scutiferana (Meyrick, 1881)

Synonyms
- Capua scutiferana Meyrick, 1881; Capua catoxia Turner, 1925

= Aeolostoma scutiferana =

Species of moth

Aeolostoma scutiferana is a species of moth of the family Tortricidae. It is found in Australia.
