= Epiphyas liadelpha =

Scientific classification
- Domain: Eukaryota
- Kingdom: Animalia
- Phylum: Arthropoda
- Class: Insecta
- Order: Lepidoptera
- Family: Tortricidae
- Genus: Epiphyas
- Species: E. liadelpha

Binomial name
- Epiphyas liadelpha (Meyrick, 1910)

Synonyms
- Tortrix liadelpha Meyrick, 1910

Species of moth

Epiphyas liadelpha is a species of moth of the family Tortricidae. It is found in Australia, where it has been recorded from Western Australia.

The wingspan is about 17.5 mm.
