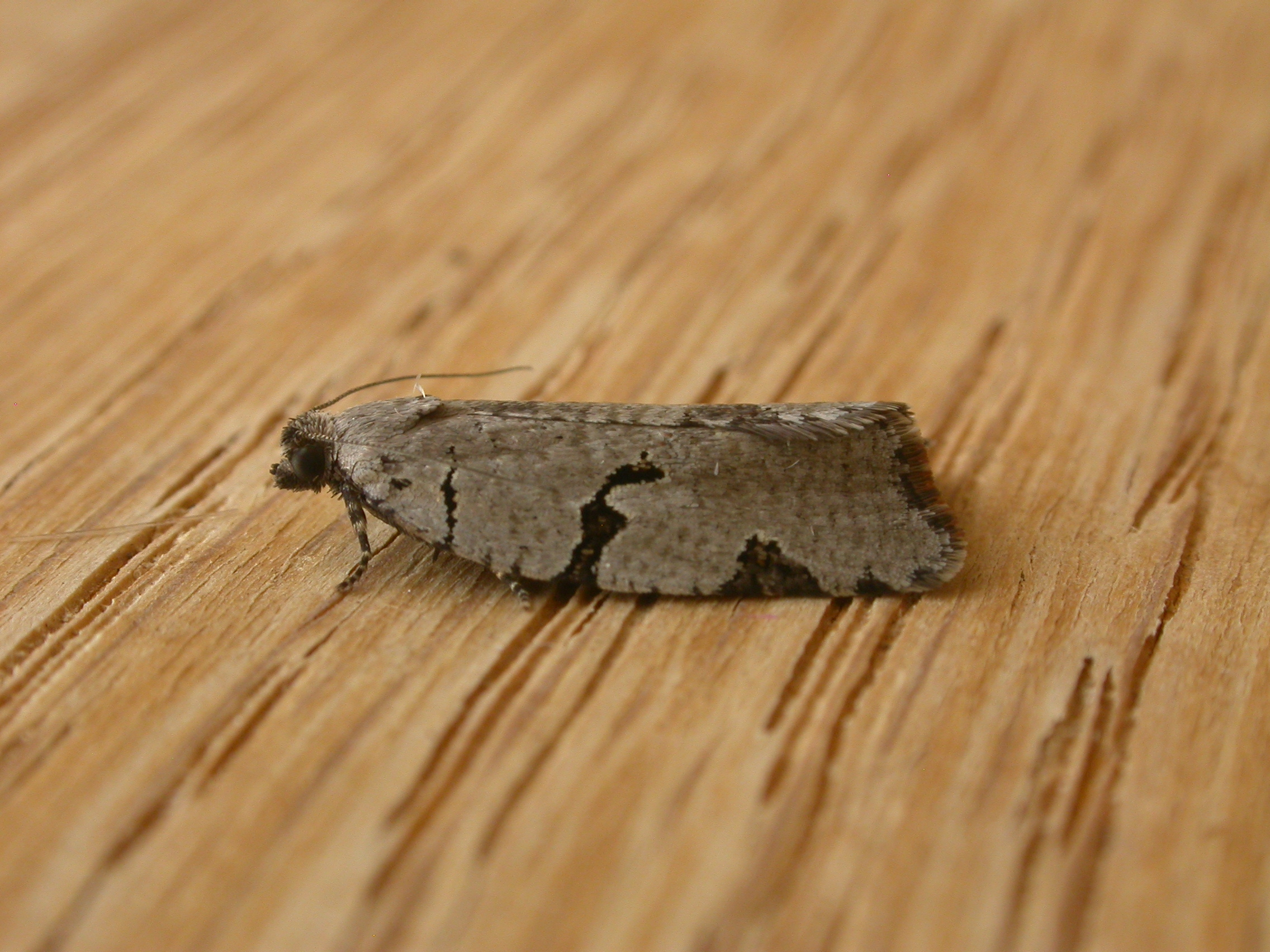

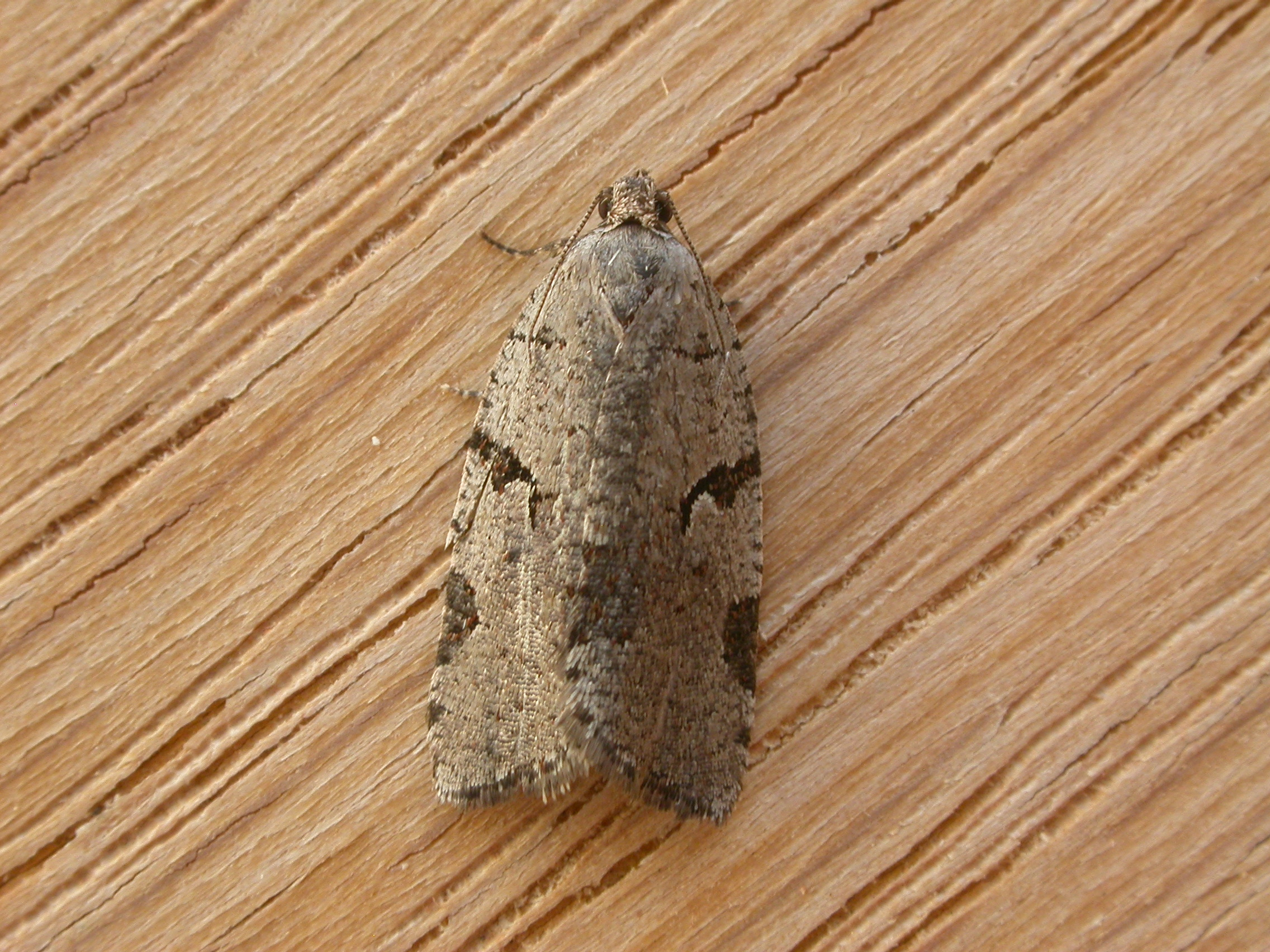

Scientific classification
- Kingdom: Animalia
- Phylum: Arthropoda
- Class: Insecta
- Order: Lepidoptera
- Family: Tortricidae
- Genus: Meritastis
- Species: M. pyrosemana

Binomial name
- Meritastis pyrosemana (Meyrick, 1881)

Synonyms
- Cacoecia pyrosemana Meyrick, 1881

= Meritastis pyrosemana =

Species of moth

Meritastis pyrosemana is a moth of the family Tortricidae. It is known from Australia, including the Australian Capital Territory, Tasmania and Victoria.

The wingspan is about 20 mm.
