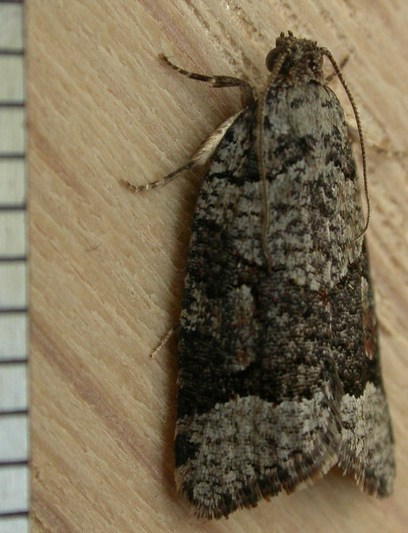

Scientific classification
- Kingdom: Animalia
- Phylum: Arthropoda
- Class: Insecta
- Order: Lepidoptera
- Family: Tortricidae
- Genus: Meritastis
- Species: M. lythrodana

Binomial name
- Meritastis lythrodana (Meyrick, 1881)

Synonyms
- Cacoecia lythrodana Meyrick, 1881

= Meritastis lythrodana =

Species of moth

Meritastis lythrodana is a species of moth of the family Tortricidae. It is found in Australia, including Tasmania. Its larvae have been found among leaf litter of Eucalyptus spp., from which it is suspected to feed. Adults have a wingspan of an approximate 2 cm.
