= Epiphyas oriotes =

Scientific classification
- Domain: Eukaryota
- Kingdom: Animalia
- Phylum: Arthropoda
- Class: Insecta
- Order: Lepidoptera
- Family: Tortricidae
- Genus: Epiphyas
- Species: E. oriotes

Binomial name
- Epiphyas oriotes (Turner, 1916)

Synonyms
- Tortrix oriotes Turner, 1916

Species of moth

Epiphyas oriotes is a species of moth of the family Tortricidae. It is found in Australia, where it has been recorded from New South Wales.

The wingspan is 14–20 mm. The forewings are grey, mixed with dark fuscous, pale ochreous and white and with white markings, edged with a mixture of dark fuscous and pale ochreous. The hindwings are fuscous.
