= Epiphyas pulla =

Scientific classification
- Domain: Eukaryota
- Kingdom: Animalia
- Phylum: Arthropoda
- Class: Insecta
- Order: Lepidoptera
- Family: Tortricidae
- Genus: Epiphyas
- Species: E. pulla

Binomial name
- Epiphyas pulla (Turner, 1945)

Synonyms
- Tortrix pulla Turner, 1945

Species of moth

Epiphyas pulla is a species of moth of the family Tortricidae. It is found in Australia, where it has been recorded from Western Australia.

The wingspan is about 16–22 mm.
