= Epiphyas lycodes =

Scientific classification
- Kingdom: Animalia
- Phylum: Arthropoda
- Clade: Pancrustacea
- Class: Insecta
- Order: Lepidoptera
- Family: Tortricidae
- Genus: Epiphyas
- Species: E. lycodes

Binomial name
- Epiphyas lycodes (Meyrick, 1910)

Synonyms
- Tortrix lycodes Meyrick, 1910

Species of moth

Epiphyas lycodes is a species of moth of the family Tortricidae. It is found in Australia, where it has been recorded from Tasmania. The habitat consists of open subalpine forests.
