= Epiphyas caryotis =

Scientific classification
- Domain: Eukaryota
- Kingdom: Animalia
- Phylum: Arthropoda
- Class: Insecta
- Order: Lepidoptera
- Family: Tortricidae
- Genus: Epiphyas
- Species: E. caryotis

Binomial name
- Epiphyas caryotis (Meyrick, 1910)

Synonyms
- Tortrix caryotis Meyrick, 1910

Species of moth

Epiphyas caryotis is a species of moth of the family Tortricidae. It is found in Australia, where it has been recorded from Victoria, the Australian Capital Territory and Tasmania. The habitat consists of montane rainforests and wet eucalypt forests.

The wingspan is about 21.5 mm.

The larvae are polyphagous and have been recorded feeding on Bossiaea, Cassinia, Daviesia, Tasmannia, Epacris, Oxylobium, Parahebe, Pimelea, Pinus and Polyscias species, as well as Nothofogus cunllinghamii and Eucalyptus regnans.
