= Aristocosma chrysophilana =

Scientific classification
- Kingdom: Animalia
- Phylum: Arthropoda
- Class: Insecta
- Order: Lepidoptera
- Family: Tortricidae
- Genus: Aristocosma
- Species: A. chrysophilana

Binomial name
- Aristocosma chrysophilana (Walker, 1863)

Synonyms
- Cacoecia chrysophilana Walker, 1863; Lamyrodes euchroma Turner, 1945

Species of moth

Aristocosma chrysophilana is a species of moth of the family Tortricidae. It is found in Australia, where it has been recorded from New South Wales.
