= Atelodora pelochytana =

Scientific classification
- Domain: Eukaryota
- Kingdom: Animalia
- Phylum: Arthropoda
- Class: Insecta
- Order: Lepidoptera
- Family: Tortricidae
- Genus: Atelodora
- Species: A. pelochytana

Binomial name
- Atelodora pelochytana Meyrick, 1881

Species of moth

Atelodora pelochytana is a species of moth of the family Tortricidae. It is found in Australia, where it has been recorded from New South Wales.
