= Epiphyas peloxythana =

Scientific classification
- Domain: Eukaryota
- Kingdom: Animalia
- Phylum: Arthropoda
- Class: Insecta
- Order: Lepidoptera
- Family: Tortricidae
- Genus: Epiphyas
- Species: E. peloxythana

Binomial name
- Epiphyas peloxythana (Meyrick, 1881)

Synonyms
- Tortrix peloxythana Meyrick, 1881

Species of moth

Epiphyas peloxythana is a species of moth of the family Tortricidae. It is found in Australia, where it has been recorded from New South Wales.

The wingspan is about 16 mm.
