= Atelodora agramma =

Scientific classification
- Domain: Eukaryota
- Kingdom: Animalia
- Phylum: Arthropoda
- Class: Insecta
- Order: Lepidoptera
- Family: Tortricidae
- Genus: Atelodora
- Species: A. agramma

Binomial name
- Atelodora agramma Lower, 1900

Species of moth

Atelodora agramma is a species of moth of the family Tortricidae. It is found in Australia, where it has been recorded from South Australia.
