= Epiphyas eucyrta =

Scientific classification
- Kingdom: Animalia
- Phylum: Arthropoda
- Clade: Pancrustacea
- Class: Insecta
- Order: Lepidoptera
- Family: Tortricidae
- Genus: Epiphyas
- Species: E. eucyrta

Binomial name
- Epiphyas eucyrta (Turner, 1926)

Synonyms
- Allactea eucyrta Turner, 1926; Tortrix leuropa Turner, 1939

Species of moth

Epiphyas eucyrta is a species of moth of the family Tortricidae. It is found in Australia, where it has been recorded from Tasmania. The habitat consists of wet heathlands at low altitudes.

The wingspan is about 16.5 millimetres (0.65 in).
