= Exeristeboda exeristis =

Scientific classification
- Domain: Eukaryota
- Kingdom: Animalia
- Phylum: Arthropoda
- Class: Insecta
- Order: Lepidoptera
- Family: Tortricidae
- Genus: Exeristeboda
- Species: E. exeristis

Binomial name
- Exeristeboda exeristis (Meyrick, 1910)

Synonyms
- Eboda exeristis Meyrick, 1910

Species of moth

Exeristeboda exeristis is a species of moth of the family Tortricidae. It is found in Australia, where it has been recorded from northern Queensland to New South Wales. The habitat consists of rainforests.

The wingspan is about 15 mm.

The larvae have been recorded feeding on Eucalyptus grandis.
