= Epitrichosma phaulera =

Scientific classification
- Kingdom: Animalia
- Phylum: Arthropoda
- Class: Insecta
- Order: Lepidoptera
- Family: Tortricidae
- Genus: Epitrichosma
- Species: E. phaulera

Binomial name
- Epitrichosma phaulera (Turner, 1916)

Synonyms
- Paranepsia phaulera Turner, 1916; Epichorista phaeoplaca Turner, 1945

Species of moth

Epitrichosma phaulera is a species of moth of the family Tortricidae. It is found in Australia, where it has been recorded from Queensland.

The wingspan is about 12 mm. The forewings are whitish grey, with fuscous irroration (speckling) and a rather large basal patch indicated by fuscous irroration. The hindwings are grey whitish.
