= Epiphyas flebilis =

Scientific classification
- Domain: Eukaryota
- Kingdom: Animalia
- Phylum: Arthropoda
- Class: Insecta
- Order: Lepidoptera
- Family: Tortricidae
- Genus: Epiphyas
- Species: E. flebilis

Binomial name
- Epiphyas flebilis (Turner, 1939)

Synonyms
- Tortrix flebilis Turner, 1939; Tortrix leucocephala Turner, 1945

Species of moth

Epiphyas flebilis is a species of moth of the family Tortricidae. It is found in Australia, where it has been recorded from Tasmania. The habitat consists of wet eucalypt and mixed forests.

The wingspan is about 16 mm.
