= Epiphyas dotatana =

Scientific classification
- Kingdom: Animalia
- Phylum: Arthropoda
- Class: Insecta
- Order: Lepidoptera
- Family: Tortricidae
- Genus: Epiphyas
- Species: E. dotatana

Binomial name
- Epiphyas dotatana (Walker, 1863)

Synonyms
- Teras dotatana Walker, 1863; Tortrix tanyptera Meyrick, 1910

Species of moth

Epiphyas dotatana is a species of moth of the family Tortricidae. It is found in Australia, where it has been recorded from Victoria, the Australian Capital Territory and Tasmania. The habitat consists of montane forests and wet eucalypt forests.

The wingspan is about 26 mm.

The larvae have been recorded feeding on Daviesia species and possibly Acacia melanoxylon.
