= Acroceuthes leucozancla =

Scientific classification
- Domain: Eukaryota
- Kingdom: Animalia
- Phylum: Arthropoda
- Class: Insecta
- Order: Lepidoptera
- Family: Tortricidae
- Genus: Acroceuthes
- Species: A. leucozancla

Binomial name
- Acroceuthes leucozancla (Turner, 1945)

Synonyms
- Axioprepes leucozancla (Turner, 1945)

Species of moth

Acroceuthes leucozancla is a species of moth of the family Tortricidae. It is found in Australia, where it has been recorded from Queensland.
