= Asthenoptycha heminipha =

Scientific classification
- Domain: Eukaryota
- Kingdom: Animalia
- Phylum: Arthropoda
- Class: Insecta
- Order: Lepidoptera
- Family: Tortricidae
- Genus: Asthenoptycha
- Species: A. heminipha

Binomial name
- Asthenoptycha heminipha (Turner, 1916)

Synonyms
- Batodes heminipha Turner, 1916

Species of moth

Asthenoptycha heminipha is a species of moth of the family Tortricidae. It is found in Australia, where it has been recorded from Queensland.

The wingspan is 14–17 mm. The forewings are brown, strigulated (finely streaked) with dark fuscous and with some whitish irroration (speckling) towards the dorsum. The hindwings are grey.
