= Epiphyas hemiphoena =

Scientific classification
- Domain: Eukaryota
- Kingdom: Animalia
- Phylum: Arthropoda
- Class: Insecta
- Order: Lepidoptera
- Family: Tortricidae
- Genus: Epiphyas
- Species: E. hemiphoena

Binomial name
- Epiphyas hemiphoena (Turner, 1927)

Synonyms
- Tortrix hemiphoena Turner, 1927

Species of moth

Epiphyas hemiphoena is a species of moth of the family Tortricidae. It is found in Australia, where it has been recorded from Tasmania. The habitat consists of mixed wet forests.

The wingspan is about 23 mm.
