= Epiphyas scleropa =

Scientific classification
- Domain: Eukaryota
- Kingdom: Animalia
- Phylum: Arthropoda
- Class: Insecta
- Order: Lepidoptera
- Family: Tortricidae
- Genus: Epiphyas
- Species: E. scleropa

Binomial name
- Epiphyas scleropa (Meyrick, 1910)

Synonyms
- Tortrix scleropa Meyrick, 1910

Species of moth

Epiphyas scleropa is a species of moth of the family Tortricidae. It is found in Australia, where it has been recorded from Victoria and New South Wales.

The wingspan is about 22–23 mm.
