= Epiphyas haematephora =

Scientific classification
- Domain: Eukaryota
- Kingdom: Animalia
- Phylum: Arthropoda
- Class: Insecta
- Order: Lepidoptera
- Family: Tortricidae
- Genus: Epiphyas
- Species: E. haematephora

Binomial name
- Epiphyas haematephora (Turner, 1916)

Synonyms
- Tortrix haematephora Turner, 1916

Species of moth

Epiphyas haematephora is a species of moth of the family Tortricidae. It is found in Australia, where it has been recorded from New South Wales.

The wingspan is 20–23 mm. The forewings are whitish, strigulated (finely streaked) with pale grey and with grey markings grey, partly suffused with bright ferruginous and blackish. The hindwings are grey whitish, with somewhat darker strigulations.
