= Meritastis trissochorda =

Scientific classification
- Domain: Eukaryota
- Kingdom: Animalia
- Phylum: Arthropoda
- Class: Insecta
- Order: Lepidoptera
- Family: Tortricidae
- Genus: Meritastis
- Species: M. trissochorda

Binomial name
- Meritastis trissochorda (Turner, 1916)

Synonyms
- Cnephasia trissochorda Turner, 1916

Species of moth

Meritastis trissochorda is a species of moth of the family Tortricidae. It is found in Australia, where it has been recorded from New South Wales.

The wingspan is about 17 mm. The forewings are whitish grey, with some fuscous strigulae (fine streaks) and dark-fuscous markings. The hindwings are whitish, strigulated with pale grey.
