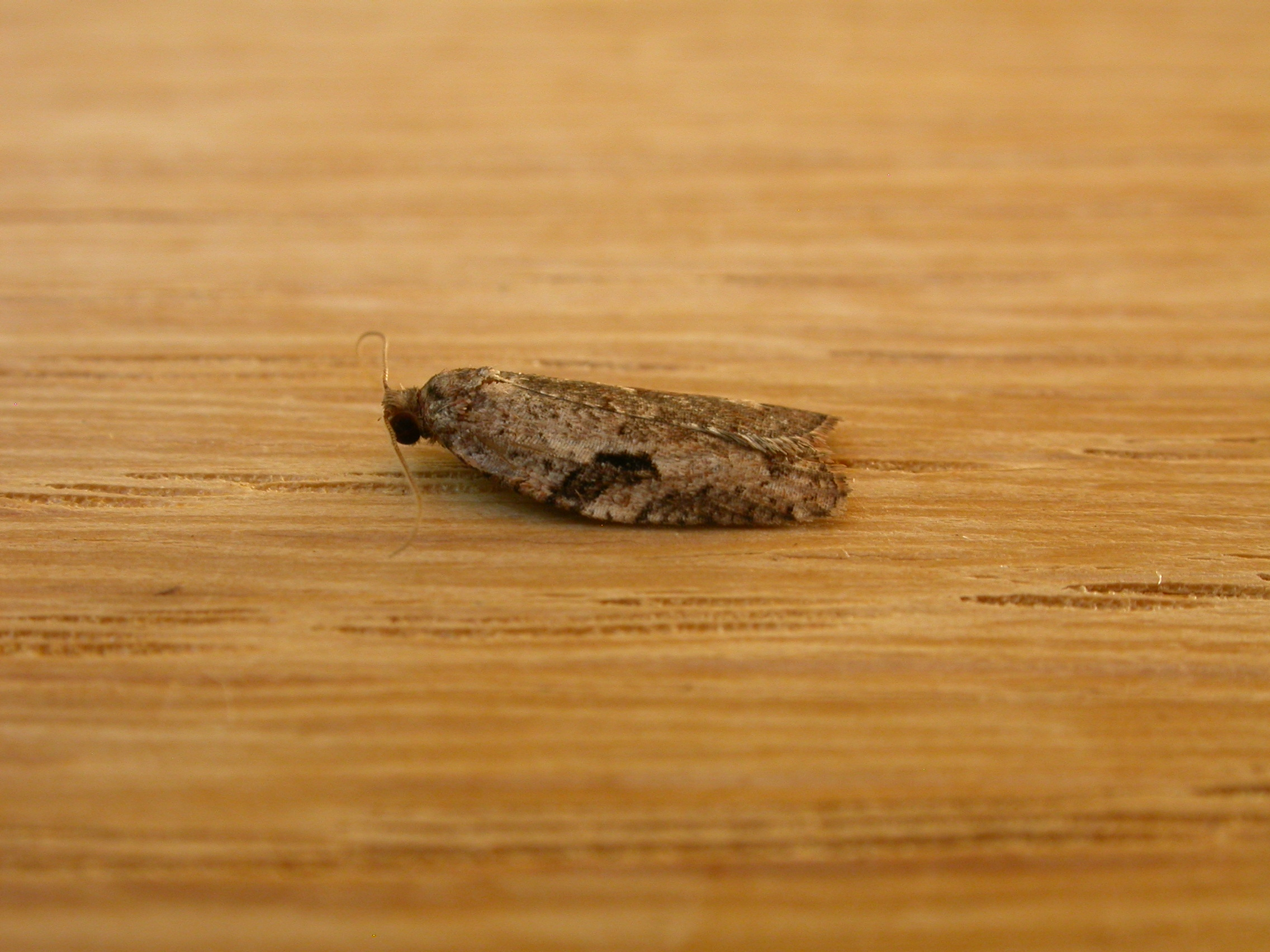

Scientific classification
- Domain: Eukaryota
- Kingdom: Animalia
- Phylum: Arthropoda
- Class: Insecta
- Order: Lepidoptera
- Family: Tortricidae
- Genus: Epiphyas
- Species: E. xylodes

Binomial name
- Epiphyas xylodes (Meyrick, 1910)

Synonyms
- Tortrix xylodes Meyrick, 1910; Tortrix eurystropha Turner, 1926; Tortrix paraplesia Turner, 1914

= Epiphyas xylodes =

Species of moth

Epiphyas xylodes is a species of moth of the family Tortricidae. It is found in Australia, where it has been recorded from Queensland and New South Wales.
