= Epiphyas cetrata =

Scientific classification
- Domain: Eukaryota
- Kingdom: Animalia
- Phylum: Arthropoda
- Class: Insecta
- Order: Lepidoptera
- Family: Tortricidae
- Genus: Epiphyas
- Species: E. cetrata

Binomial name
- Epiphyas cetrata (Meyrick, 1910)

Synonyms
- Tortrix cetrata Meyrick, 1910

Species of moth

Epiphyas cetrata is a species of moth of the family Tortricidae. It is found in Australia, where it has been recorded from Tasmania. The habitat consists of open forests.

The wingspan is about 16 mm.
