= Epiphyas haematodes =

Scientific classification
- Domain: Eukaryota
- Kingdom: Animalia
- Phylum: Arthropoda
- Class: Insecta
- Order: Lepidoptera
- Family: Tortricidae
- Genus: Epiphyas
- Species: E. haematodes

Binomial name
- Epiphyas haematodes (Turner, 1916)

Synonyms
- Tortrix haematodes Turner, 1916

Species of moth

Epiphyas haematodes is a species of moth of the family Tortricidae. It is found in Australia, where it has been recorded from New South Wales.

The wingspan is 15–19 mm. The forewings are fuscous, sometimes dotted with dark fuscous and usually reticulated with bright ferruginous. The hindwings are pale grey.
