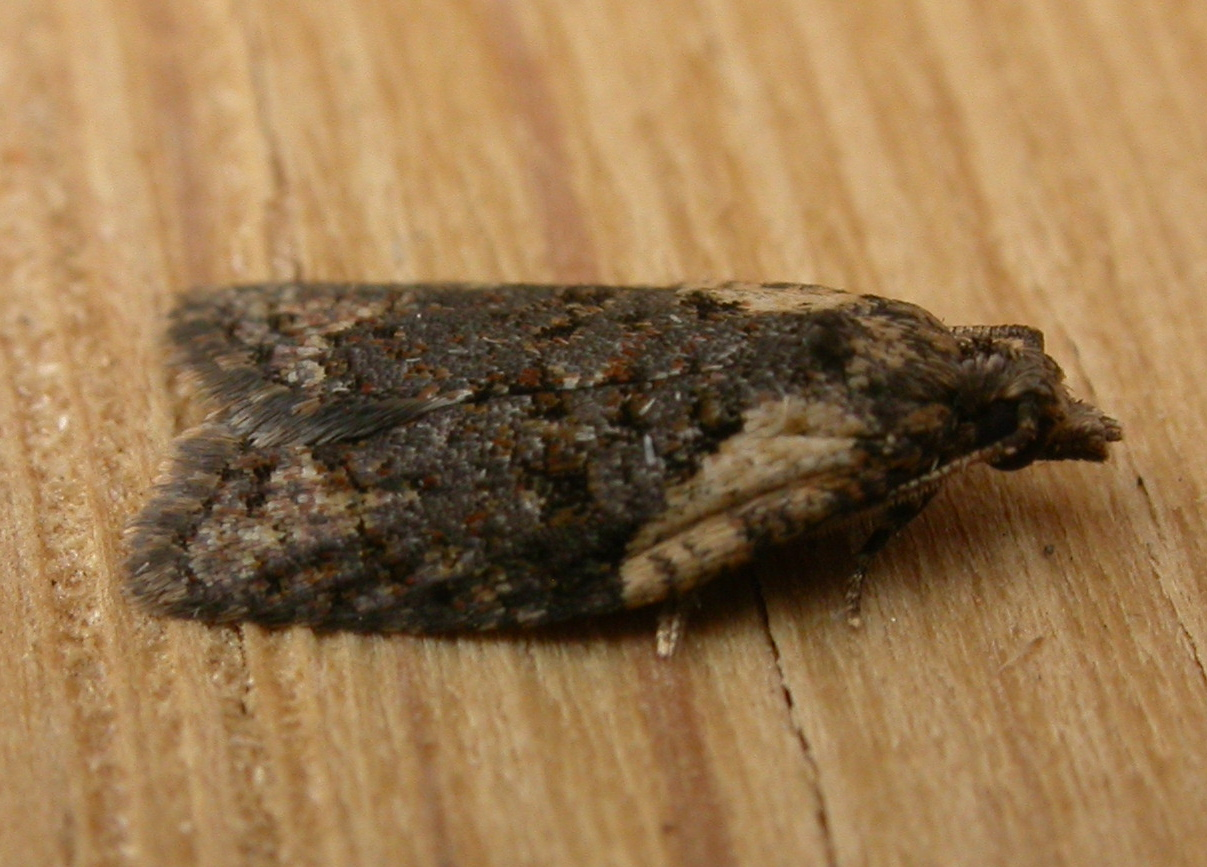

Scientific classification
- Kingdom: Animalia
- Phylum: Arthropoda
- Class: Insecta
- Order: Lepidoptera
- Family: Tortricidae
- Genus: Capua
- Species: C. intractana

Binomial name
- Capua intractana (Walker, 1869)

Synonyms
- Sperchia intractana' Walker, 1869; Sperchia obfuscatana Meyrick, 1881; Sperchia sordidatana' Meyrick, 1881

= Capua intractana =

Species of moth

Capua intractana is a species of moth of the family Tortricidae. It is found in Australia, including Tasmania, as well as New Zealand. This species was first described by Francis Walker in 1869 and named Sperchia intractana.

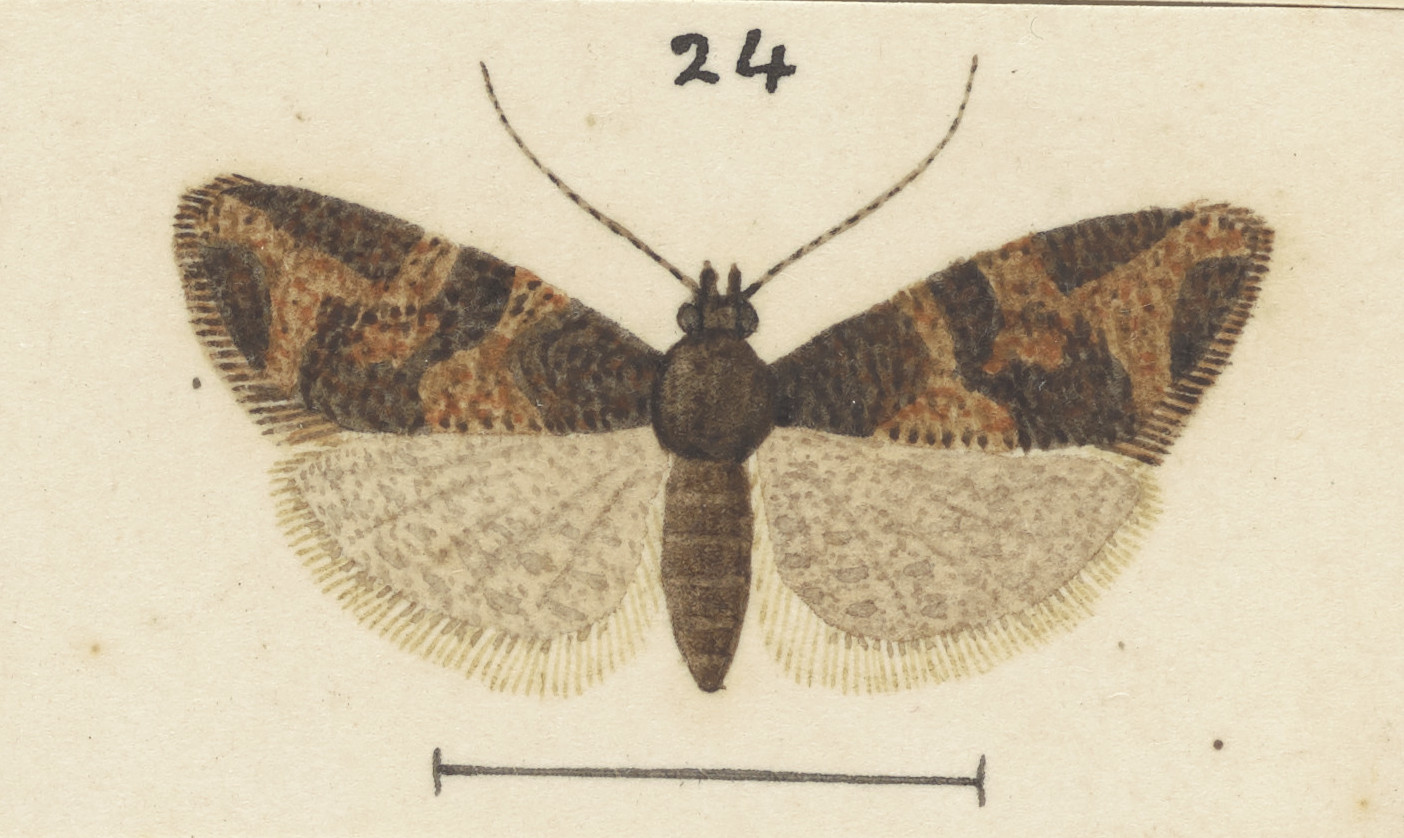
Capua intractana illustrated by George Hudson.
