= Epiphyas eveleena =

Scientific classification
- Domain: Eukaryota
- Kingdom: Animalia
- Phylum: Arthropoda
- Class: Insecta
- Order: Lepidoptera
- Family: Tortricidae
- Genus: Epiphyas
- Species: E. eveleena

Binomial name
- Epiphyas eveleena (Lower, 1916)

Synonyms
- Tortrix eveleena Lower, 1916

Species of moth

Epiphyas eveleena is a species of moth of the family Tortricidae. It is found in Australia, where it has been recorded from South Australia and Western Australia.

The wingspan is about 18 mm.
