= Epiphyas euphara =

Scientific classification
- Domain: Eukaryota
- Kingdom: Animalia
- Phylum: Arthropoda
- Class: Insecta
- Order: Lepidoptera
- Family: Tortricidae
- Genus: Epiphyas
- Species: E. euphara

Binomial name
- Epiphyas euphara (Turner, 1945)

Synonyms
- Tortrix euphara Turner, 1945

Species of moth

Epiphyas euphara is a species of moth of the family Tortricidae. It is found in Australia, where it has been recorded from Queensland and New South Wales.

The wingspan is about 21 mm.
