= Epiphyas erysibodes =

Scientific classification
- Domain: Eukaryota
- Kingdom: Animalia
- Phylum: Arthropoda
- Class: Insecta
- Order: Lepidoptera
- Family: Tortricidae
- Genus: Epiphyas
- Species: E. erysibodes

Binomial name
- Epiphyas erysibodes (Turner, 1916)

Synonyms
- Tortrix erysibodes Turner, 1916

Species of moth

Epiphyas erysibodes is a species of moth of the family Tortricidae. It is found in Australia, where it has been recorded from New South Wales and Tasmania. The habitat consists of open forests.

The wingspan is 18–20 mm. The forewings are grey, with a few whitish scales and five or six irregular ochreous-brown transverse lines. The hindwings are pale grey, with faint darker strigulations (fine streaks).

The larvae have been recorded feeding on Olearia ramulosa.
