= Epiphyas asthenopis =

Scientific classification
- Domain: Eukaryota
- Kingdom: Animalia
- Phylum: Arthropoda
- Class: Insecta
- Order: Lepidoptera
- Family: Tortricidae
- Genus: Epiphyas
- Species: E. asthenopis

Binomial name
- Epiphyas asthenopis (Lower, 1902)

Synonyms
- Tortrix asthenopis Lower, 1902; Hyperxena zirophora Turner, 1916; Bactra eurysticha Turner, 1946; Cnephasia polia Turner, 1945

Species of moth found in Australia

Epiphyas asthenopis is a species of moth of the family Tortricidae. It is found in Australia, where it has been recorded from New South Wales and Victoria.

The wingspan is 17 mm. The ground colour of the forewings is pale-grey, but grey-whitish towards the base. There is a pale-brownish subdorsal blotch, margined by a whitish suffusion. The hindwings are whitish.
