= Epiphyas fabricata =

Scientific classification
- Domain: Eukaryota
- Kingdom: Animalia
- Phylum: Arthropoda
- Class: Insecta
- Order: Lepidoptera
- Family: Tortricidae
- Genus: Epiphyas
- Species: E. fabricata

Binomial name
- Epiphyas fabricata (Meyrick, 1910)

Synonyms
- Tortrix fabricata Meyrick, 1910

Species of moth

Epiphyas fabricata is a species of moth of the family Tortricidae. It is found in Australia, where it has been recorded from Victoria, New South Wales and Tasmania. The habitat consists of montane forests and wet eucalypt forests.
