= Epiphyas cerussata =

Scientific classification
- Domain: Eukaryota
- Kingdom: Animalia
- Phylum: Arthropoda
- Class: Insecta
- Order: Lepidoptera
- Family: Tortricidae
- Genus: Epiphyas
- Species: E. cerussata

Binomial name
- Epiphyas cerussata (Meyrick, 1910)

Synonyms
- Tortrix cerussata Meyrick, 1910

Species of moth

Epiphyas cerussata is a species of moth of the family Tortricidae. It is found in Australia, where it has been recorded from Victoria, New South Wales and Tasmania. The habitat consists of montane forests and wet eucalypt forests at altitudes above 400 meters.

The wingspan is about 22 mm.

The larvae have been recorded feeding on Olearia phlogopappa.
