= Icelita monela =

Scientific classification
- Kingdom: Animalia
- Phylum: Arthropoda
- Class: Insecta
- Order: Lepidoptera
- Family: Tortricidae
- Genus: Icelita
- Species: I. monela

Binomial name
- Icelita monela Clarke, 1976

Species of moth

Icelita monela is a species of moth of the family Tortricidae. It is found on the Marshall Islands, the southern Mariana Islands, the eastern Caroline Islands and in New Caledonia and Australia, where it has been recorded from Queensland.
