= Authomaema pentacosma =

Scientific classification
- Domain: Eukaryota
- Kingdom: Animalia
- Phylum: Arthropoda
- Class: Insecta
- Order: Lepidoptera
- Family: Tortricidae
- Genus: Authomaema
- Species: A. pentacosma

Binomial name
- Authomaema pentacosma (Lower, 1900)

Synonyms
- Anatropia pentacosma Lower, 1900

Species of moth

Authomaema pentacosma is a species of moth of the family Tortricidae. It is found in Australia, where it has been recorded from New South Wales.

The wingspan is about 13 mm.
