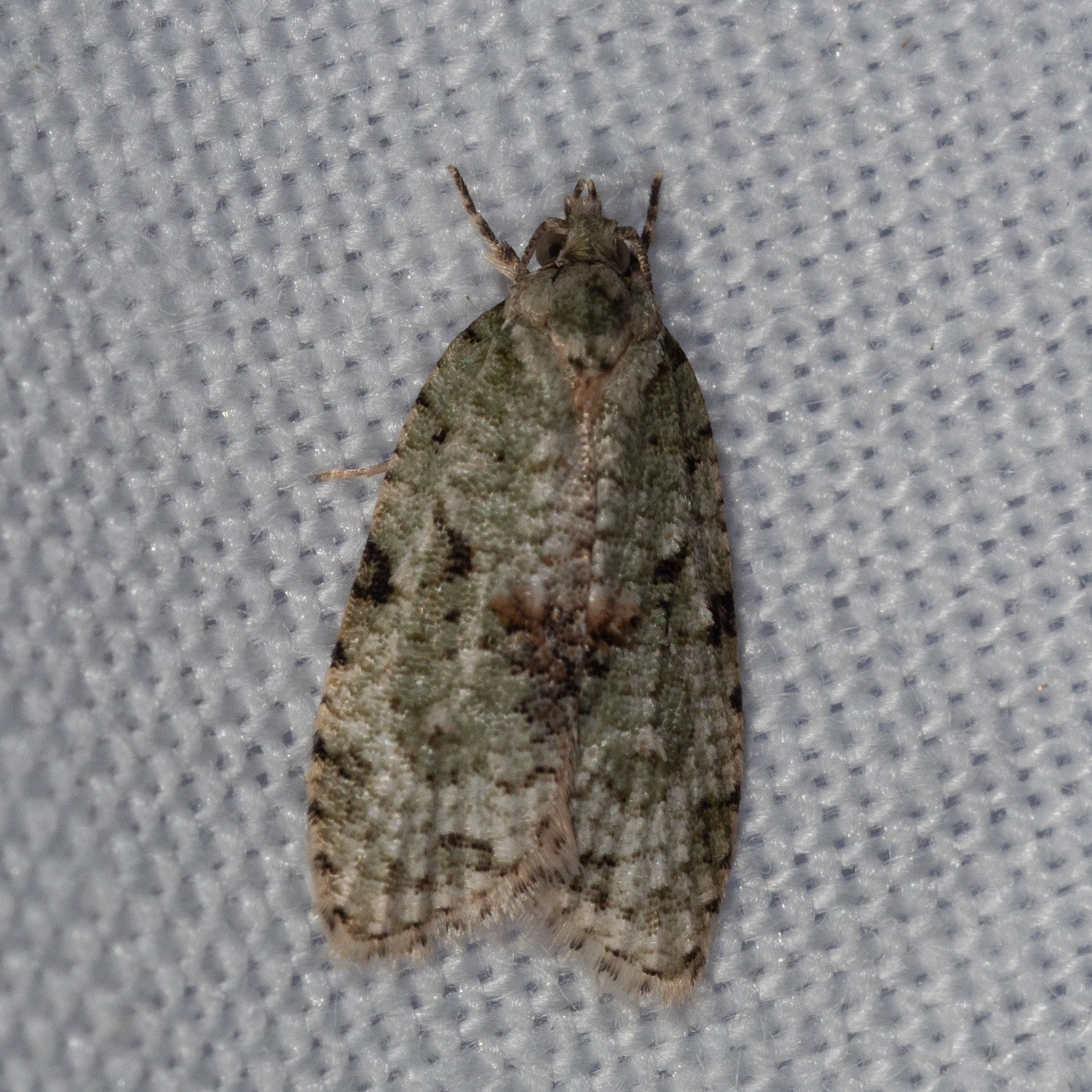

Scientific classification
- Kingdom: Animalia
- Phylum: Arthropoda
- Clade: Pancrustacea
- Class: Insecta
- Order: Lepidoptera
- Family: Tortricidae
- Genus: Epitrichosma
- Species: E. crymodes

Binomial name
- Epitrichosma crymodes (Turner, 1916)

Synonyms
- List: Schoenotenes crymodes Turner, 1916; Tortrix leucoptera Turner, 1925; Schoenotenes craspedospila Turner, 1945

= Epitrichosma crymodes =

Species of moth

Epitrichosma crymodes is a species of moth in the family Tortricidae. It is found in Australia, where it has been recorded from New South Wales and Queensland.

The wingspan is about 12 mm. The forewings are whitish, with pale grey strigulae (fine streaks) forming ill-defined markings. The hindwings are whitish.
