= Apateta cryphia =

Scientific classification
- Kingdom: Animalia
- Phylum: Arthropoda
- Class: Insecta
- Order: Lepidoptera
- Family: Tortricidae
- Genus: Apateta
- Species: A. cryphia

Binomial name
- Apateta cryphia Turner, 1926

Species of moth

Apateta cryphia is a species of moth of the family Tortricidae. It is found in Australia.
