= Epiphyas eugramma =

Scientific classification
- Domain: Eukaryota
- Kingdom: Animalia
- Phylum: Arthropoda
- Class: Insecta
- Order: Lepidoptera
- Family: Tortricidae
- Genus: Epiphyas
- Species: E. eugramma

Binomial name
- Epiphyas eugramma (Lower, 1899)

Synonyms
- Tortrix eugramma Lower, 1899

Species of moth

Epiphyas eugramma is a species of moth of the family Tortricidae. It is found in Australia, where it has been recorded from Victoria.

The wingspan is about 16 mm.
