= Epiphyas hyperacria =

Scientific classification
- Domain: Eukaryota
- Kingdom: Animalia
- Phylum: Arthropoda
- Class: Insecta
- Order: Lepidoptera
- Family: Tortricidae
- Genus: Epiphyas
- Species: E. hyperacria

Binomial name
- Epiphyas hyperacria (Turner, 1916)

Synonyms
- Epichorista hyperacria Turner, 1916

Species of moth

Epiphyas hyperacria is a species of moth of the family Tortricidae. It is found in Australia, where it has been recorded from New South Wales.

The wingspan is 12–16 mm. The forewings are grey, irrorated (speckled) with pale ochreous. The hindwings are grey.
