= Asthenoptycha sphaltica =

Scientific classification
- Kingdom: Animalia
- Phylum: Arthropoda
- Clade: Pancrustacea
- Class: Insecta
- Order: Lepidoptera
- Family: Tortricidae
- Genus: Asthenoptycha
- Species: A. sphaltica

Binomial name
- Asthenoptycha sphaltica Meyrick, 1910

Species of moth

Asthenoptycha sphaltica is a species of moth of the family Tortricidae. It is found in Australia in the states of New South Wales and Victoria.

Adults have dark brown-and-white wings, with a pale mark on the inner margin of each forewing. The hindwings are a uniform pale grey.
