= Epiphyas oresigona =

Scientific classification
- Domain: Eukaryota
- Kingdom: Animalia
- Phylum: Arthropoda
- Class: Insecta
- Order: Lepidoptera
- Family: Tortricidae
- Genus: Epiphyas
- Species: E. oresigona

Binomial name
- Epiphyas oresigona (Turner, 1939)

Synonyms
- Tortrix oresigona Turner, 1939

Species of moth

Epiphyas oresigona is a species of moth of the family Tortricidae. It is found in Australia, where it has been recorded from Tasmania. The habitat consists of alpine heathland.

The wingspan is about 15 mm. There is one generation per year.

The larvae feed on Helichrysum ledifolium and possibly Helichrysum hookeri. Larvae have been recorded from August to mid-January.
