= Epiphyas plastica =

Scientific classification
- Kingdom: Animalia
- Phylum: Arthropoda
- Class: Insecta
- Order: Lepidoptera
- Family: Tortricidae
- Genus: Epiphyas
- Species: E. plastica

Binomial name
- Epiphyas plastica (Meyrick, 1910)

Synonyms
- Tortrix plastica Meyrick, 1910

Species of moth

Epiphyas plastica is a species of moth of the family Tortricidae. It is found in Australia, where it has been recorded from Tasmania. The habitat consists of margins of wet forests at mid-altitudes.

The wingspan is about 17 mm.

The larvae feed on Cassinia aculeata.
