= Holocola chlidana =

Scientific classification
- Domain: Eukaryota
- Kingdom: Animalia
- Phylum: Arthropoda
- Class: Insecta
- Order: Lepidoptera
- Family: Tortricidae
- Genus: Holocola
- Species: H. chlidana

Binomial name
- Holocola chlidana (Turner, 1927)

Synonyms
- Epiphyas chlidana Turner, 1926

Species of moth

Holocola chlidana is a species of moth of the family Tortricidae. It is found in Australia, where it has been recorded from Tasmania. The habitat consists of wet forests.

The wingspan is about 16.5 mm.
