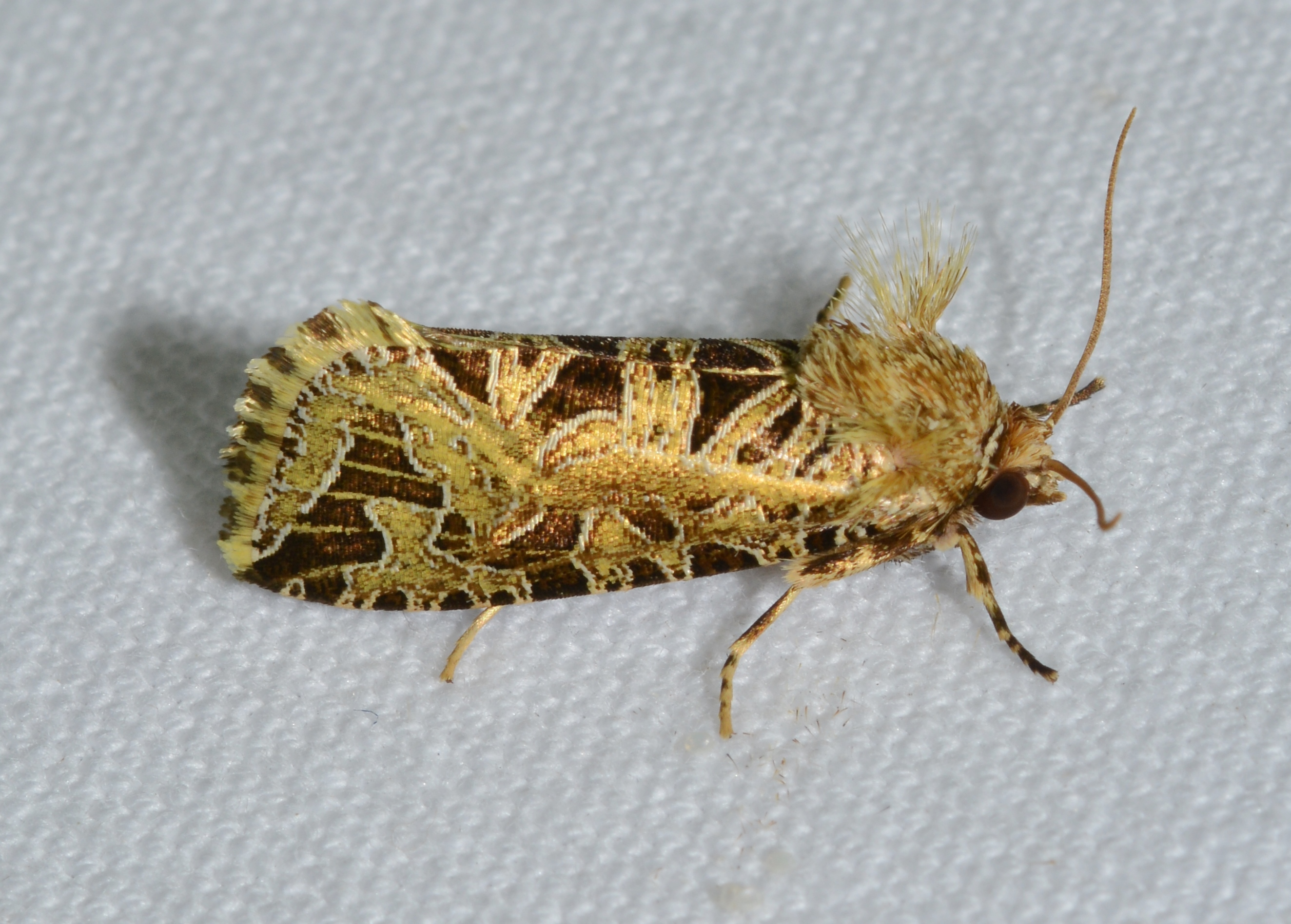
- An Auratonota species from Costa Rica.

Scientific classification
- Kingdom: Animalia
- Phylum: Arthropoda
- Clade: Pancrustacea
- Class: Insecta
- Order: Lepidoptera
- Family: Tortricidae
- Subfamily: Chlidanotinae
- Tribe: Chlidanotini; Meyrick, 1906

Genera
- See text

= Chlidanotini =

Tribe of moths

Chlidanotini is a tribe of leafroller moths that belongs to the subfamily Childanotinae. Members of the tribe are most common in the Neotrops and New World but have been found in Oriental, Australian and Afrotropics.

Fossil genera and species have been known to occur in the Dominican ambers. However not many have been described due to the difficulty, and sometimes impossibly, of describing key characteristics such as wing ventilation, genitalia, etc.

== Description ==
The tribe is defined by several synapomorphies. It shares two synapomorphies with Hilarographini those being 1) presence of hami and 2) a brush-shaped signum that extends from the area of the accessory bursa. It has flattened antennae that don't have conspicuous setae. The apical portion of their forewibgs are bent upwards and at rest.

== Ecology ==
Much if their biology, including their immature states, are unknown. Some species from South Africa, such as the larvae of Electracma minyops, can be seen inhabiting the galls of white milkwood (Sideroxylon inerme). Auratonota dispersa from Central America have been recorded feeding on orchid species which it the only known recorded instance of a food plant for any species of this tribe.

== Distribution ==
While most species are common in the Neotropical regions, they can be found in the Oriental, Australian and Afrotropical regions too. In the New World, members of this tribe can be found in Cuba, Dominica, Mexico, Brazil, Ecuador and Venezuela. Only three species have been known from the eastern Palearctic realms (regions such as Japan), they are Trymalitis escharia, Archimaga philomima and various Metrernis species. The first species to be reported from Korea is genus Nabangana.

== Taxonomy ==
This tribe was established in 1906 by Edward Meyrick, an English entomologist who specialized in the study of micromoths (microlepidoptera).

This tribe seems to be closely related to Hilarographini with Polyorthini being the out-group.

=== Genera ===
This tribe contains many genera and more than 50 species. A list of genera and previously included genera can be found below:

- Archimaga
- Auratonota
- Branchophantis
- Caenognosis
- Chlidanota
- Diabolo (= Diablo)
- Daulocnema
- Electracma
- Gnaphalostoma
- Heppnerographa
- Iconostigma
- Leurogyia
- Macrochlidia
- Metrernis
- Monortha
- Nabangana
- Picroxena
- Pseudocomotis
- Trymalitis
- Utrivalva

=== Previously placed genera ===
- Hynhamia
