= Mictocommosis stemmatias =

Scientific classification
- Kingdom: Animalia
- Phylum: Arthropoda
- Class: Insecta
- Order: Lepidoptera
- Family: Tortricidae
- Subfamily: Chlidanotinae
- Tribe: Hilarographini
- Genus: Mictocommosis
- Species: M. stemmatias

Binomial name
- Mictocommosis stemmatias (Meyrick, 1921)

Synonyms
- Mictopsichia stemmatias Meyrick, 1921

Species of moth

Mictocommosis stemmatias is a species of moth of the family Tortricidae. It is found on Sulawesi, an island in Indonesia.
