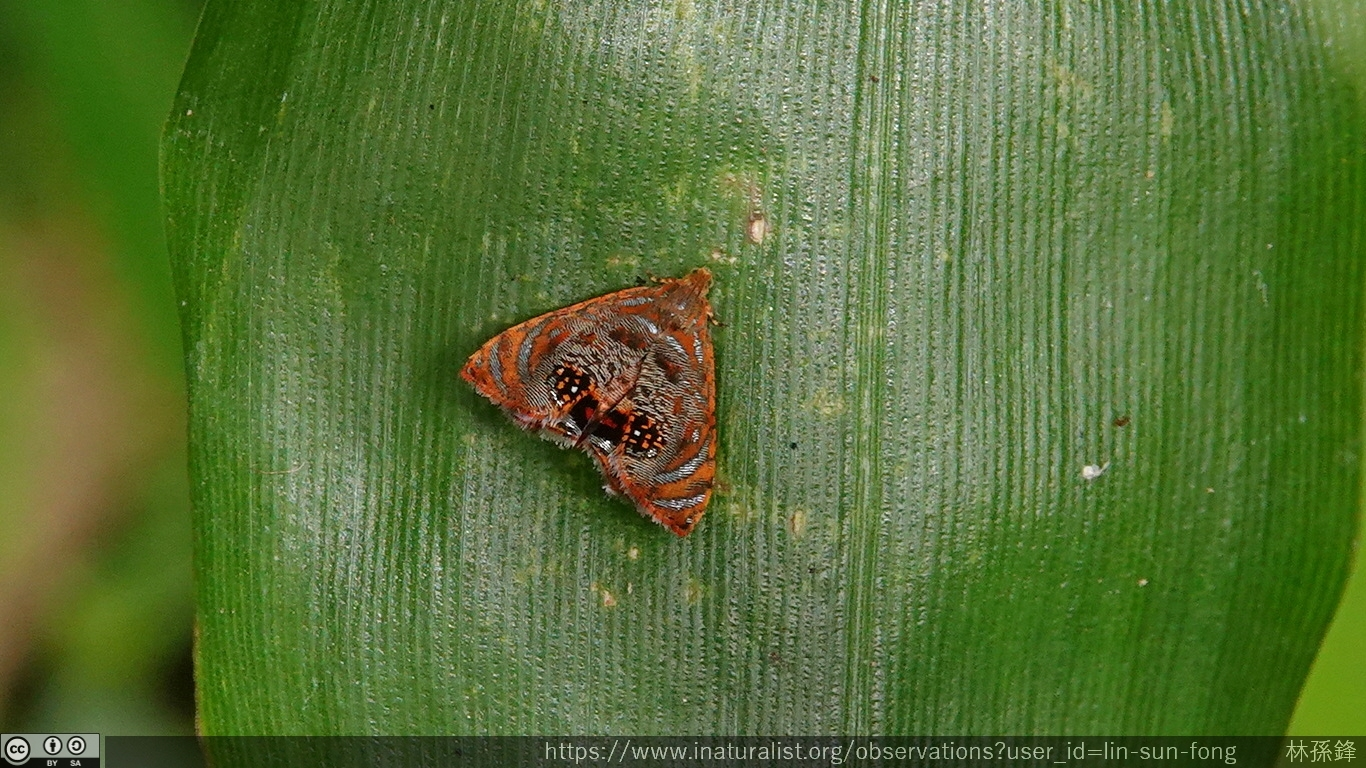
- Mictocommosis nigromaculata, Taiwan

Scientific classification
- Kingdom: Animalia
- Phylum: Arthropoda
- Class: Insecta
- Order: Lepidoptera
- Family: Tortricidae
- Subfamily: Chlidanotinae
- Tribe: Hilarographini
- Genus: Mictocommosis
- Species: M. nigromaculata

Binomial name
- Mictocommosis nigromaculata (Issiki, 1930)

Synonyms
- Simaethis nigromaculata Issiki, 1930; Anthophila nigromaculata; Mictopsichia nigromaculata; Simaethis takaonis Matsumura, 1931; Anthophila takaonis

= Mictocommosis nigromaculata =

Species of moth

Mictocommosis nigromaculata is a species of moth of the family Tortricidae. It is found in Japan (including Honshu), as well as Vietnam and Taiwan.

The wingspan is 13–15 mm.
