= Mictocommosis microctenota =

Scientific classification
- Kingdom: Animalia
- Phylum: Arthropoda
- Class: Insecta
- Order: Lepidoptera
- Family: Tortricidae
- Subfamily: Chlidanotinae
- Tribe: Hilarographini
- Genus: Mictocommosis
- Species: M. microctenota

Binomial name
- Mictocommosis microctenota (Meyrick, 1933)

Synonyms
- Mictopsichia microctenota Meyrick, 1933

Species of moth

Mictocommosis microctenota is a species of moth of the family Tortricidae. It is found in Sierra Leone.
