= Mictocommosis argus =

Scientific classification
- Domain: Eukaryota
- Kingdom: Animalia
- Phylum: Arthropoda
- Class: Insecta
- Order: Lepidoptera
- Family: Tortricidae
- Subfamily: Chlidanotinae
- Tribe: Hilarographini
- Genus: Mictocommosis
- Species: M. argus

Binomial name
- Mictocommosis argus (Walsingham, 1897)

Synonyms
- Mictopsichia argus Walsingham, 1897

Species of moth

Mictocommosis argus is a species of moth of the family Tortricidae. It is found in Cameroon, Republic of Congo, Democratic Republic of Congo, Equatorial Guinea and Gabon.
