= Mictocommosis godmani =

Scientific classification
- Domain: Eukaryota
- Kingdom: Animalia
- Phylum: Arthropoda
- Class: Insecta
- Order: Lepidoptera
- Family: Tortricidae
- Subfamily: Chlidanotinae
- Tribe: Hilarographini
- Genus: Mictocommosis
- Species: M. godmani

Binomial name
- Mictocommosis godmani (Walsingham, 1914)

Synonyms
- Mictopsichia godmani Walsingham, 1914

Species of moth

Mictocommosis godmani is a species of moth of the family Tortricidae. It is found in Tabasco, Mexico.
