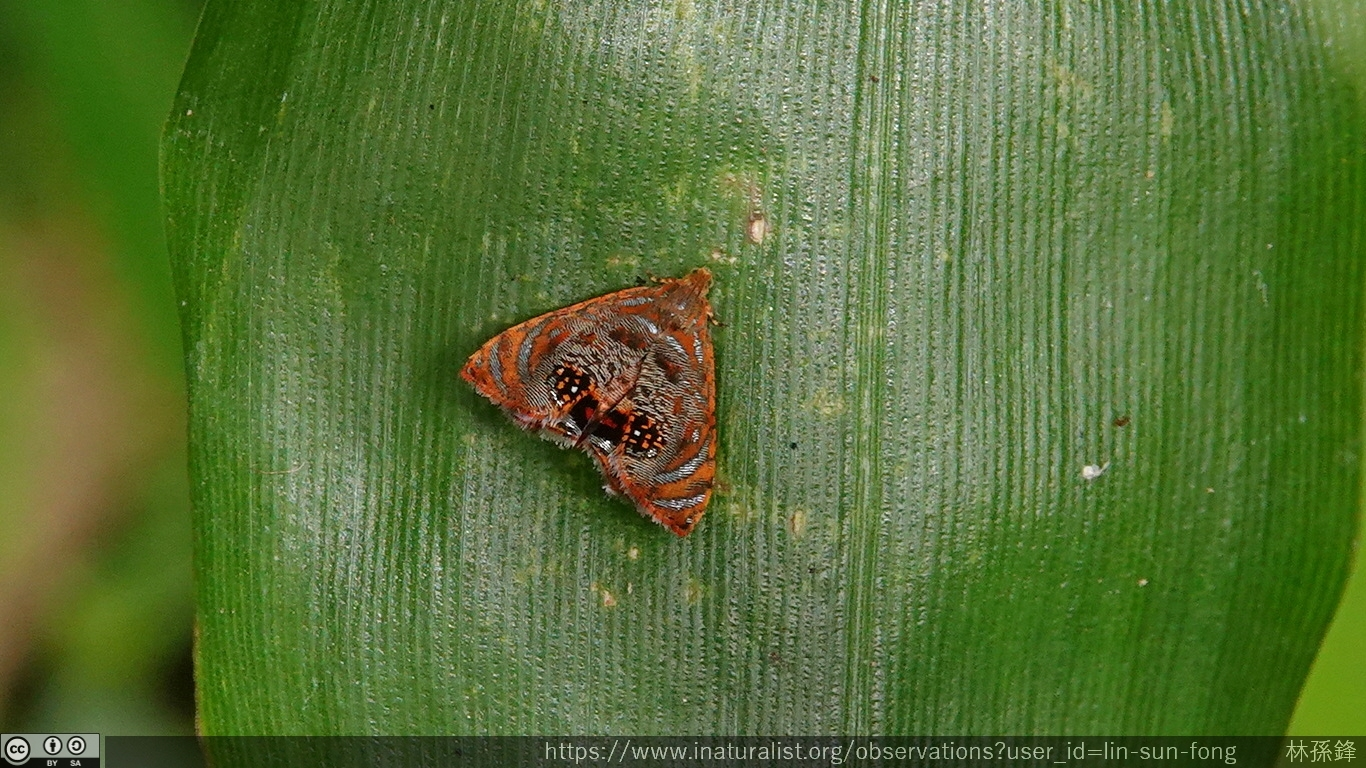
- Mictocommosis nigromaculata, Taiwan

Scientific classification
- Domain: Eukaryota
- Kingdom: Animalia
- Phylum: Arthropoda
- Class: Insecta
- Order: Lepidoptera
- Family: Tortricidae
- Subfamily: Chlidanotinae
- Tribe: Hilarographini
- Genus: Mictocommosis; Diakonoff, 1977

= Mictocommosis =

Genus of tortrix moths

Mictocommosis is a genus of tortricid moths in the family Tortricidae. There are about six described species in Mictocommosis.

== Species ==
These six species belong to the genus Mictocommosis:

- Mictocommosis argus (Walsingham, 1897)
- Mictocommosis godmani (Walsingham, 1914)
- Mictocommosis lesleyae Austin & Dombroskie, 2020
- Mictocommosis microctenota (Meyrick, 1933)
- Mictocommosis nigromaculata (Issiki, 1930)
- Mictocommosis stemmatias (Meyrick, 1921)
