= Iconostigma =

Scientific classification
- Kingdom: Animalia
- Phylum: Arthropoda
- Class: Insecta
- Order: Lepidoptera
- Family: Tortricidae
- Subfamily: Chlidanotinae
- Tribe: Chlidanotini
- Genus: Iconostigma; Tuck, 1981

Species
- See text

Genus of moths

Iconostigma is a genus of moths belonging to the family Tortricidae.

== Species ==
- Iconostigma morosa Tuck, 1981
- Iconostigma tryphaena Tuck, 1981
