= Microgramma =

Microgramma may refer to:

- Microgramma (plant), a genus of ferns in the family Polypodiaceae
- Microgramma (typeface)
