= Diablo (moth) =

Scientific classification
- Kingdom: Animalia
- Phylum: Arthropoda
- Class: Insecta
- Order: Lepidoptera
- Family: Tortricidae
- Subfamily: Chlidanotinae
- Tribe: Chlidanotini
- Genus: Diablo; Razowski & Pelz, 2007
- Species: D. diantoniorum

Binomial name
- Diablo diantoniorum Razowski & Pelz, 2007

Synonyms
- Diabolo; Diabolo diantoniorum

Species of moth

Diablo is a genus of butterflies and moths in the family Tortricidae. This genus has a single species, Diablo diantoniorum, found in Ecuador.
