= Maldonada =

Maldonada can refer to:-

- Maldonada (Gulliver's Travels), a fictional city in Jonathan Swift's satire
- The Maldonada redbelly toad, endemic to Brazil
- Auratonota maldonada, a species of moth found in Ecuador
- Laura Maldonada Clapper, a character in the novel The Widow's Children

== See also ==
- Maldonado (disambiguation)
