= Tortrimosaica =

Scientific classification
- Kingdom: Animalia
- Phylum: Arthropoda
- Class: Insecta
- Order: Lepidoptera
- Family: Tortricidae
- Tribe: Hilarographini
- Genus: Tortrimosaica; Brown & Baixeras, 2004
- Species: T. polypodivora

Binomial name
- Tortrimosaica polypodivora Brown & Baixeras in Brown, Baixeras, Solorzano-Filho & Kraus, 2004

Monotypic genus of tortrix moths

Tortrimosaica is a genus of moths belonging to the family Tortricidae. It contains only one species, Tortrimosaica polypodivora, which is found in Brazil.

The larvae are gall inducers on the stems of Microgramma squamulosa.
