= Metrernis ochrolina =

Scientific classification
- Kingdom: Animalia
- Phylum: Arthropoda
- Class: Insecta
- Order: Lepidoptera
- Family: Tortricidae
- Genus: Metrernis
- Species: M. ochrolina

Binomial name
- Metrernis ochrolina Meyrick, 1906

Synonyms
- Archimaga euplocamis Meyrick, 1918

Species of moth

Metrernis ochrolina is a species of moth of the family Tortricidae first described by Edward Meyrick in 1906. It is found in Sri Lanka.
