= Chlidanota thriambis =

Scientific classification
- Kingdom: Animalia
- Phylum: Arthropoda
- Class: Insecta
- Order: Lepidoptera
- Family: Tortricidae
- Genus: Chlidanota
- Species: C. thriambis

Binomial name
- Chlidanota thriambis Meyrick, 1906

Species of moth

Chlidanota thriambis is a species of moth of the family Tortricidae. It is found in Sri Lanka.
