= Trymalitis climacias =

Scientific classification
- Kingdom: Animalia
- Phylum: Arthropoda
- Class: Insecta
- Order: Lepidoptera
- Family: Tortricidae
- Genus: Trymalitis
- Species: T. climacias

Binomial name
- Trymalitis climacias Meyrick, 1911

Species of moth

Trymalitis climacias is a species of moth of the family Tortricidae. It is found in Queensland, Australia.
