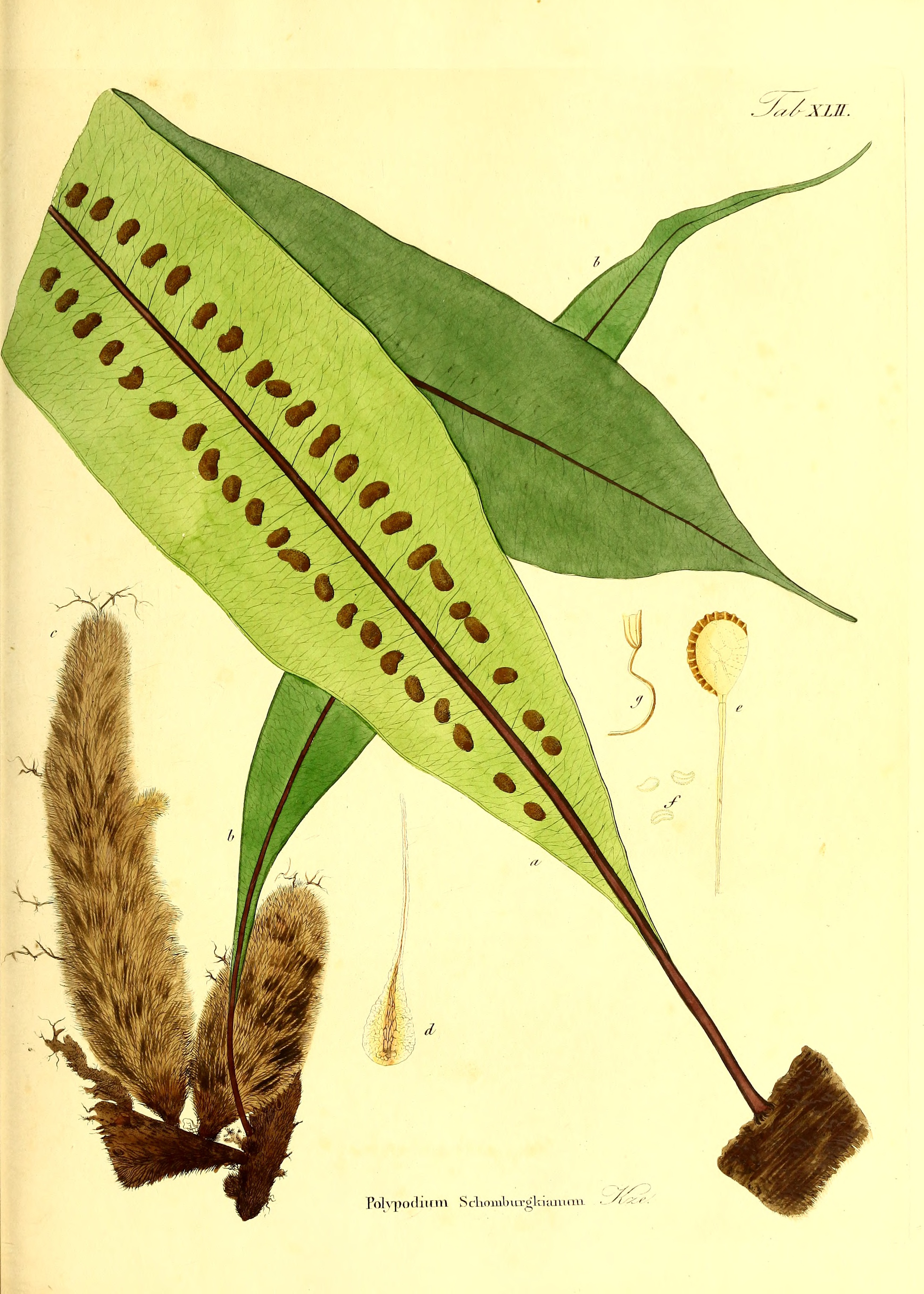

Scientific classification
- Kingdom: Plantae
- Clade: Embryophytes
- Clade: Tracheophytes
- Division: Polypodiophyta
- Class: Polypodiopsida
- Order: Polypodiales
- Suborder: Polypodiineae
- Family: Polypodiaceae
- Genus: Microgramma
- Species: M. megalophylla

Binomial name
- Microgramma megalophylla (Desv.) de la Sota

Synonyms
- Anapeltis megalophylla (Desv.) Pic.Serm.; Polypodium megalophyllum Desv.; Phymatodes schomburgkiana J.Sm.; Drynaria schomburgkiana Fée; Mecosorus schomburgkii Klotzsch; Pleopeltis schomburgkiana T.Moore; Polypodium schomburgkianum Kunze; Polypodium schomburgkii Hook.

= Microgramma megalophylla =

Species of fern

Microgramma megalophylla is a species of epiphytic fern, native to tropical South America. It is a myrmecophyte, producing domatia in its rhizome which ants live.
