= Idiothauma rigatiella =

Scientific classification
- Kingdom: Animalia
- Phylum: Arthropoda
- Class: Insecta
- Order: Lepidoptera
- Family: Tortricidae
- Genus: Idiothauma
- Species: I. rigatiella

Binomial name
- Idiothauma rigatiella (Ghesquire, 1940)

Synonyms
- Hilarographa rigatiella Ghesquire, 1940

Species of moth

Idiothauma rigatiella is a species of moth of the family Tortricidae. It is found in the Democratic Republic of Congo.
