= Monortha povedai =

Scientific classification
- Kingdom: Animalia
- Phylum: Arthropoda
- Clade: Pancrustacea
- Class: Insecta
- Order: Lepidoptera
- Family: Tortricidae
- Genus: Monortha
- Species: M. povedai

Binomial name
- Monortha povedai Razowski & Pelz, 2007

Species of moth

Monortha povedai is a species of moth of the family Tortricidae. It is found in Ecuador.
