= Branchophantis chrysoschista =

Scientific classification
- Kingdom: Animalia
- Phylum: Arthropoda
- Class: Insecta
- Order: Lepidoptera
- Family: Tortricidae
- Genus: Branchophantis
- Species: B. chrysoschista

Binomial name
- Branchophantis chrysoschista Meyrick, 1938

Species of moth

Branchophantis chrysoschista is a species of moth of the family Tortricidae. It is found in Papua New Guinea.
