= Pseudocomotis citroleuca =

Scientific classification
- Kingdom: Animalia
- Phylum: Arthropoda
- Class: Insecta
- Order: Lepidoptera
- Family: Tortricidae
- Genus: Pseudocomotis
- Species: P. citroleuca

Binomial name
- Pseudocomotis citroleuca (Meyrick, 1912)

Synonyms
- Cnephasia citroleuca Meyrick, 1912; Orthocomotis citroleuca

Species of moth

Pseudocomotis citroleuca is a species of moth of the family Tortricidae. It is found in Colombia.
