= Hynhamia cerina =

Scientific classification
- Kingdom: Animalia
- Phylum: Arthropoda
- Clade: Pancrustacea
- Class: Insecta
- Order: Lepidoptera
- Family: Tortricidae
- Genus: Hynhamia
- Species: H. cerina

Binomial name
- Hynhamia cerina (Razowski & Becker, 1999)

Synonyms
- Paraneulia cerina Razowski & Becker, 1999

Species of moth

Hynhamia cerina is a species of moth of the family Tortricidae. It is found in Paraná, Brazil.
