= Pseudocomotis chingualana =

Scientific classification
- Kingdom: Animalia
- Phylum: Arthropoda
- Class: Insecta
- Order: Lepidoptera
- Family: Tortricidae
- Genus: Pseudocomotis
- Species: P. chingualana

Binomial name
- Pseudocomotis chingualana Razowski & Wojtusiak, 2009

Species of moth

Pseudocomotis chingualana is a species of moth of the family Tortricidae. It is found in Ecuador.

The wingspan is about 21.5 mm.
