= Nexosa marmarastra =

Scientific classification
- Kingdom: Animalia
- Phylum: Arthropoda
- Class: Insecta
- Order: Lepidoptera
- Family: Tortricidae
- Genus: Nexosa
- Species: N. marmarastra

Binomial name
- Nexosa marmarastra (Meyrick, 1932)

Synonyms
- Mictopsichia marmarastra Meyrick, 1932

Species of moth

Nexosa marmarastra is a species of moth of the family Tortricidae. It is found on Java.
