= Electracma hemichroa =

Scientific classification
- Kingdom: Animalia
- Phylum: Arthropoda
- Class: Insecta
- Order: Lepidoptera
- Family: Tortricidae
- Genus: Electracma
- Species: E. hemichroa

Binomial name
- Electracma hemichroa Meyrick, 1906

Species of moth

Electracma hemichroa is a species of moth of the family Tortricidae. It is found in Sri Lanka.
