= Iconostigma morosa =

Scientific classification
- Kingdom: Animalia
- Phylum: Arthropoda
- Class: Insecta
- Order: Lepidoptera
- Family: Tortricidae
- Genus: Iconostigma
- Species: I. morosa

Binomial name
- Iconostigma morosa Tuck, 1981

Species of moth

Iconostigma morosa is a species of moth of the family Tortricidae. It is found in New Caledonia in the southwest Pacific Ocean.
