= Trymalitis =

Scientific classification
- Kingdom: Animalia
- Phylum: Arthropoda
- Class: Insecta
- Order: Lepidoptera
- Family: Tortricidae
- Tribe: Chlidanotini
- Genus: Trymalitis; Meyrick, 1905

Type species
- Trymalitis margarias Meyrick, 1905

Species
- See text

Synonyms
- Trimalitis Diakonoff, 1960; Trymaltis Meyrick, 1911

Genus of tortrix moths

Trymalitis is a genus of moths belonging to the family Tortricidae.

== Species ==
- Trymalitis cataracta Meyrick, 1907
- Trymalitis climacias Meyrick, 1911
- Trymalitis escharia Clarke, 1976
- Trymalitis macarista Meyrick, 1934
- Trymalitis margarias Meyrick, 1905
- Trymalitis optima Meyrick, 1911
- Trymalitis scalifera Meyrick, 1912
