= Pseudocomotis albolineana =

Scientific classification
- Domain: Eukaryota
- Kingdom: Animalia
- Phylum: Arthropoda
- Class: Insecta
- Order: Lepidoptera
- Family: Tortricidae
- Genus: Pseudocomotis
- Species: P. albolineana

Binomial name
- Pseudocomotis albolineana Brown, 1990

Species of moth

Pseudocomotis albolineana is a species of moth of the family Tortricidae. It is found in Ecuador.
