= Pseudocomotis nortena =

Scientific classification
- Kingdom: Animalia
- Phylum: Arthropoda
- Class: Insecta
- Order: Lepidoptera
- Family: Tortricidae
- Genus: Pseudocomotis
- Species: P. nortena

Binomial name
- Pseudocomotis nortena Brown, 1998

Species of moth

Pseudocomotis nortena is a species of moth of the family Tortricidae. It is found in Costa Rica.

The length of the forewings is about 18 mm for males and 19–24 mm for females.
