= Branchophantis =

Scientific classification
- Kingdom: Animalia
- Phylum: Arthropoda
- Class: Insecta
- Order: Lepidoptera
- Family: Tortricidae
- Tribe: Chlidanotini
- Genus: Branchophantis; Meyrick, 1938

Species
- See text

Genus of tortrix moths

Branchophantis is a genus of moths belonging to the family Tortricidae.

== Species ==
- Branchophantis chrysoschista Meyrick, 1938
