= Hynhamia obscurana =

Scientific classification
- Kingdom: Animalia
- Phylum: Arthropoda
- Class: Insecta
- Order: Lepidoptera
- Family: Tortricidae
- Genus: Hynhamia
- Species: H. obscurana

Binomial name
- Hynhamia obscurana Razowski & Pelz, 2007

Species of moth

Hynhamia obscurana is a species of moth of the family Tortricidae. It is found in Ecuador.

The wingspan is 16 mm.

== Etymology ==
The species name refers to the dark colouration of the species and is derived from Latin obscurana (meaning dark).
