= Trymalitis margarias =

Scientific classification
- Kingdom: Animalia
- Phylum: Arthropoda
- Class: Insecta
- Order: Lepidoptera
- Family: Tortricidae
- Genus: Trymalitis
- Species: T. margarias

Binomial name
- Trymalitis margarias Meyrick, 1905

Species of moth

The sapodilla seed borer, (Trymalitis margarias) is a species of moth of the family Tortricidae. It is found in Sri Lanka. This species has a wingspan of 17-20mm.

== Ecology ==
It is a highly invasive species that attacks sapodilla species very often. The attack symptoms are only visible after days of infestation of larva. Larvae emerge from the seeds. Damaged fruits are frequented by small black ants.
