= Auratonota aporema =

Scientific classification
- Domain: Eukaryota
- Kingdom: Animalia
- Phylum: Arthropoda
- Class: Insecta
- Order: Lepidoptera
- Family: Tortricidae
- Genus: Auratonota
- Species: A. aporema

Binomial name
- Auratonota aporema (Dognin, 1912)

Synonyms
- Cnephasia aporema Dognin, 1912

Species of moth

Auratonota aporema is a species of moth of the family Tortricidae. It is found in Colombia.
