= Trymalitis cataracta =

Scientific classification
- Kingdom: Animalia
- Phylum: Arthropoda
- Class: Insecta
- Order: Lepidoptera
- Family: Tortricidae
- Genus: Trymalitis
- Species: T. cataracta

Binomial name
- Trymalitis cataracta Meyrick, 1907

Synonyms
- Trymaltis [sic] optima Meyrick, 1911; Trymalitis optima T. B. Fletcher, 1931; Trymalitis macarista Meyrick, 1934

Species of moth

Trymalitis cataracta is a species of moth of the family Tortricidae first described by Edward Meyrick in 1907. It is found in Sri Lanka, Australia, New Guinea, Bismarck Archipelago, Caroline Islands, Fiji, Java, Siam, Andaman Islands, Africa and Madagascar.
