= Auratonota petalocrossa =

Scientific classification
- Kingdom: Animalia
- Phylum: Arthropoda
- Class: Insecta
- Order: Lepidoptera
- Family: Tortricidae
- Genus: Auratonota
- Species: A. petalocrossa

Binomial name
- Auratonota petalocrossa (Meyrick, 1926)

Synonyms
- Eulia petalocrossa Meyrick, 1926

Species of moth

Auratonota petalocrossa is a species of moth of the family Tortricidae. It is found in Costa Rica and Colombia.
