= Idiothauma malgassicella =

Scientific classification
- Domain: Eukaryota
- Kingdom: Animalia
- Phylum: Arthropoda
- Class: Insecta
- Order: Lepidoptera
- Family: Tortricidae
- Genus: Idiothauma
- Species: I. malgassicella

Binomial name
- Idiothauma malgassicella Viette, 1958

Synonyms
- Idiothauma malagassicellum Razowski, 1995

Species of moth

Idiothauma malgassicella is a species of moth of the family Tortricidae. It is found in Madagascar.
