= Hynhamia microsocia =

Scientific classification
- Kingdom: Animalia
- Phylum: Arthropoda
- Class: Insecta
- Order: Lepidoptera
- Family: Tortricidae
- Genus: Hynhamia
- Species: H. microsocia

Binomial name
- Hynhamia microsocia Razowski, 1999

Species of moth

Hynhamia microsocia is a species of moth of the family Tortricidae. It is found in Ecuador.
