= Pseudocomotis =

Scientific classification
- Kingdom: Animalia
- Phylum: Arthropoda
- Class: Insecta
- Order: Lepidoptera
- Family: Tortricidae
- Tribe: Chlidanotini
- Genus: Pseudocomotis; Brown, 1990

Species
- See text

Genus of tortrix moths

Pseudocomotis is a genus of moths belonging to the family Tortricidae.

== Species ==
- Pseudocomotis agatharcha Meyrick, 1926
- Pseudocomotis albolineana Brown, 1990
- Pseudocomotis chingualana Razowski & Wojtusiak, 2009
- Pseudocomotis citroleuca Meyrick, 1912
- Pseudocomotis nortena Brown, 1998
- Pseudocomotis razowskii Pelz, 2004
- Pseudocomotis scardiana Dognin, 1905
- Pseudocomotis serendipita Brown, 1990
