= Pseudocomotis agatharcha =

Scientific classification
- Kingdom: Animalia
- Phylum: Arthropoda
- Class: Insecta
- Order: Lepidoptera
- Family: Tortricidae
- Genus: Pseudocomotis
- Species: P. agatharcha

Binomial name
- Pseudocomotis agatharcha (Meyrick, 1926)

Synonyms
- Eulia agatharcha Meyrick, 1926

Species of moth

Pseudocomotis agatharcha is a species of moth of the family Tortricidae. It is found in Colombia.
