= Auratonota stigmosa =

Scientific classification
- Kingdom: Animalia
- Phylum: Arthropoda
- Clade: Pancrustacea
- Class: Insecta
- Order: Lepidoptera
- Family: Tortricidae
- Genus: Auratonota
- Species: A. stigmosa

Binomial name
- Auratonota stigmosa Razowski & Becker, 2000

Species of moth

Auratonota stigmosa is a species of moth of the family Tortricidae. It is found in Ecuador.
