= Nexosa aureola =

Scientific classification
- Domain: Eukaryota
- Kingdom: Animalia
- Phylum: Arthropoda
- Class: Insecta
- Order: Lepidoptera
- Family: Tortricidae
- Genus: Nexosa
- Species: N. aureola

Binomial name
- Nexosa aureola Diakonoff, 1977

Species of moth

Nexosa aureola is a species of moth of the family Tortricidae. It is found in New Guinea.

The wingspan is about 11 mm.

== Etymology ==
The species name is derived from aureoles (meaning lovely).
