= Auratonota aurochra =

Scientific classification
- Domain: Eukaryota
- Kingdom: Animalia
- Phylum: Arthropoda
- Class: Insecta
- Order: Lepidoptera
- Family: Tortricidae
- Genus: Auratonota
- Species: A. aurochra

Binomial name
- Auratonota aurochra Razowski & Wojtusiak, 2006

Species of moth

Auratonota aurochra is a species of moth of the family Tortricidae which is endemic to Ecuador.

The wingspan is about 22 millimetres (0.87 in).
