= Monortha procera =

Scientific classification
- Kingdom: Animalia
- Phylum: Arthropoda
- Class: Insecta
- Order: Lepidoptera
- Family: Tortricidae
- Genus: Monortha
- Species: M. procera

Binomial name
- Monortha procera Razowski, 2004

Species of moth

Monortha procera is a species of moth of the family Tortricidae. It is found in Ecuador.

The wingspan is about 17.5 mm.
