= Hynhamia decora =

Scientific classification
- Kingdom: Animalia
- Phylum: Arthropoda
- Class: Insecta
- Order: Lepidoptera
- Family: Tortricidae
- Genus: Hynhamia
- Species: H. decora

Binomial name
- Hynhamia decora Razowski & Pelz, 2007

Species of moth

Hynhamia decora is a species of moth of the family Tortricidae. It is found in Ecuador.

The wingspan is 17 mm.
