= Metrernis =

Scientific classification
- Kingdom: Animalia
- Phylum: Arthropoda
- Class: Insecta
- Order: Lepidoptera
- Family: Tortricidae
- Tribe: Chlidanotini
- Genus: Metrernis; Meyrick, 1906

Species
- See text

Genus of tortrix moths

Metrernis is a genus of moths belonging to the family Tortricidae.

== Species ==
- Metrernis ochrolina Meyrick, 1906
- Metrernis tencatei Diakonoff, 1957
