= Auratonota yukipana =

Scientific classification
- Kingdom: Animalia
- Phylum: Arthropoda
- Class: Insecta
- Order: Lepidoptera
- Family: Tortricidae
- Genus: Auratonota
- Species: A. yukipana

Binomial name
- Auratonota yukipana Razowski & Pelz, 2007

Species of moth

Auratonota yukipana is a species of moth of the family Tortricidae. It is found in Ecuador.
