= Trymalitis optima =

Scientific classification
- Kingdom: Animalia
- Phylum: Arthropoda
- Class: Insecta
- Order: Lepidoptera
- Family: Tortricidae
- Genus: Trymalitis
- Species: T. optima

Binomial name
- Trymalitis optima Meyrick, 1911

Species of moth

Trymalitis optima is a species of moth of the family Tortricidae. It is found in Australia (Queensland), Madagascar, Indonesia and New Guinea.

Adults have brown forewings, with brown-edged orange spots at the apex, the costa and in the middle. The hindwings are plain brown.
