= Hynhamia conceptionana =

Scientific classification
- Kingdom: Animalia
- Phylum: Arthropoda
- Class: Insecta
- Order: Lepidoptera
- Family: Tortricidae
- Genus: Hynhamia
- Species: H. conceptionana

Binomial name
- Hynhamia conceptionana Razowski & Pelz, 2007

Species of moth

Hynhamia conceptionana is a species of moth of the family Tortricidae. It is found in Ecuador.

The wingspan is about 25 mm.
