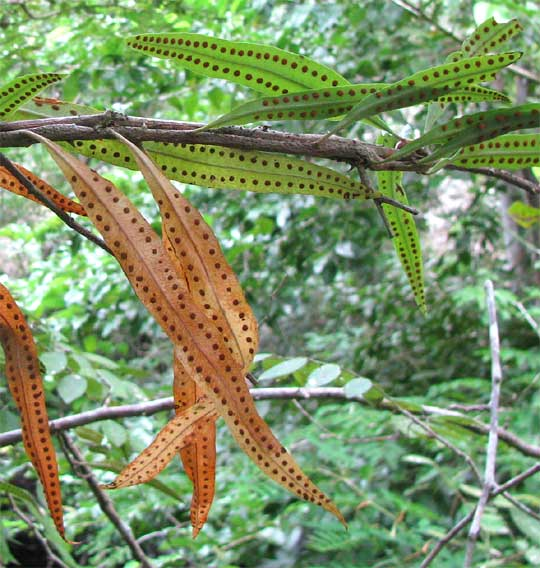

Scientific classification
- Kingdom: Plantae
- Clade: Embryophytes
- Clade: Tracheophytes
- Division: Polypodiophyta
- Class: Polypodiopsida
- Order: Polypodiales
- Suborder: Polypodiineae
- Family: Polypodiaceae
- Genus: Microgramma
- Species: M. nitida

Binomial name
- Microgramma nitida (J.Sm.) A.R.Sm.

Synonyms
- Phlebodium nitidum J.Sm.; Phymatodes palmeri (Maxon) Conz.; Anapeltis palmeri (Maxon) Pic.Serm.; Polypodium palmeri Maxon

= Microgramma nitida =

Species of plant

Microgramma nitida, with no commonly used English name other than snake fern, shared with several other plants, is a species of epiphytic fern native mostly to tropical wet forests of the New World. It belongs to the family Polypodiaceae.

== Description ==
Noteworthy features of Microgramma nitida:

- Stem-like rhizomes are long-creeping, up to 6 mm (1/4 in) thick, covered with silvery or whitish hairs (trichomes) and brown to reddish scales; leaves are spaced along the stems.
- Leaves with no lobes, teeth or indentations usually are at least twice as long as wide and up to 3 cm (1 1/8 in) across. No scales dot the lower surfaces. Leaf veins coming off the midvein are hard to see, but they connect with one another, not extending to the margin.
- Sori are roundish and well separated from one another, appearing in one row between the midrib and margin.

== Distribution ==
Microgramma nitida occurs in Mexico's eastern states from Tamaulipas southward, throughout Central America, and in the Caribbean on the islands of Jamaica, Barbados, Trinidad and San Andrés and Providencia. In the US state of Florida Microgramma nitida has escaped from cultivation.

== Habitat ==
In Mexico's Yucatan Peninsula Microgramma nitida occurs both in dry forest and moist ones as well as in the mangroves. In the southern Mexican state of Oaxaca it occurs in dry scrubland. In northeastern Honduras it is found in an area with tropical forest with yearly rainfall ranging between 1600 and 3600 mm (63-142 inches).

== As a terrarium plant ==
Microgramma nitida is marketed as perfect for decorating terrarium walls, adding a certain texture with its bright green leaves and spreading slowly via creeping rhizomes. It is well-suited to terrariums where light is filtered and diffused, and humidity levels are kept high.

== In traditional medicine ==
In the Mexican states of Puebla and Tabasco, a decoction made from the rhizome of Microgramma nitida is used to treat kidney problems. A decoction of other parts is drunk to alleviate pain of the liver and purify the blood. In Veracruz state it has been documented as used for snakebite. Among the Mayan people of the Yucatan Peninsula it is used for stomach ache, including cramps, colics and gastritis, as well as internal parasites.

== Taxonomy ==
Microgramma nitida was first formally described in 1846 under the basionym Phlebotium nitidum by John Smith, the first curator at the Royal Botanic Gardens, Kew. The Gardens' plant was sterile, noted as inhabiting Honduras, as having been introduced into the Gardens in 1844 by Mrs. Col. Macdonald, and as being "... apparently an undescribed species."

=== Phylogeny ===
Molecular phylogenetic analysis based on sequence analysis from five plastid regions of Microgramma species recognized four main clades inside the genus, of which Microgramma nitida belonged to the Persicariifolia clade. This clade comprises species usually occurring as epiphytes on tree trunks, but which keep contact with soil through rhizomes or pending roots. It is sister to Microgramma lindbergii.

=== Etymology ===
The genus name Microgramma derives from the Greek mikros meaning "small", and gramme, meaning "line." This refers to the elongated sori observed on the type species, though Microgramma nitida has round sori.

The species name nitida is from Latin meaning "shiny." When John Smith named the taxon he did not say what he saw about the fern that was shiny, though possibly the fern's indumentum of silvery or whitish, hair-like (trichomes) on the rhizomes could suggest a certain luminescence.
