= Caenognosis =

Scientific classification
- Kingdom: Animalia
- Phylum: Arthropoda
- Class: Insecta
- Order: Lepidoptera
- Family: Tortricidae
- Tribe: Chlidanotini
- Genus: Caenognosis; Walsingham, 1900

Species
- See text

Synonyms
- Epirrhoeca Meyrick, 1911

Genus of tortrix moths

Caenognosis is a genus of moths belonging to the family Tortricidae.

== Species ==
- Caenognosis incisa Walsingham in Andrews, 1900
