= Auratonota sucumbiosa =

Scientific classification
- Kingdom: Animalia
- Phylum: Arthropoda
- Class: Insecta
- Order: Lepidoptera
- Family: Tortricidae
- Genus: Auratonota
- Species: A. sucumbiosa

Binomial name
- Auratonota sucumbiosa Razowski & Wojtusiak, 2009

Species of moth

Auratonota sucumbiosa is a species of moth of the family Tortricidae. It is found in the East Cordillera of Ecuador.

The wingspan is about 36 mm.
