= Hynhamia runtuana =

Scientific classification
- Domain: Eukaryota
- Kingdom: Animalia
- Phylum: Arthropoda
- Class: Insecta
- Order: Lepidoptera
- Family: Tortricidae
- Genus: Hynhamia
- Species: H. runtuana

Binomial name
- Hynhamia runtuana Razowski & Wojtusiak, 2009

Species of moth

Hynhamia runtuana is a species of moth of the family Tortricidae. It is found in Ecuador.

The wingspan is about 22 millimetres (0.87 in).
