= Auratonota aenigmatica =

Scientific classification
- Kingdom: Animalia
- Phylum: Arthropoda
- Class: Insecta
- Order: Lepidoptera
- Family: Tortricidae
- Genus: Auratonota
- Species: A. aenigmatica

Binomial name
- Auratonota aenigmatica (Meyrick, 1912)

Synonyms
- Cnephasia aenigmatica Meyrick, 1912; Hilarographa aenigmatica

Species of moth

Auratonota aenigmatica is a species of moth of the family Tortricidae. It is found in Colombia.
