= Hynhamia patatea =

Scientific classification
- Kingdom: Animalia
- Phylum: Arthropoda
- Clade: Pancrustacea
- Class: Insecta
- Order: Lepidoptera
- Family: Tortricidae
- Genus: Hynhamia
- Species: H. patatea

Binomial name
- Hynhamia patatea Razowski & Becker, 2011

Species of moth

Hynhamia patatea is a species of moth of the family Tortricidae. It lives in Ecuador.

The wingspan is about 26 mm.

== Etymology ==
The specific name refers to the name of the type locality.
