= Hynhamia diversa =

Scientific classification
- Kingdom: Animalia
- Phylum: Arthropoda
- Clade: Pancrustacea
- Class: Insecta
- Order: Lepidoptera
- Family: Tortricidae
- Genus: Hynhamia
- Species: H. diversa

Binomial name
- Hynhamia diversa Razowski & Becker, 2011

Species of moth

Hynhamia diversa is a species of moth of the family Tortricidae. It is found in Ecuador.

The wingspan is about 19.5 mm.
