= Hynhamia hemileuca =

Scientific classification
- Kingdom: Animalia
- Phylum: Arthropoda
- Class: Insecta
- Order: Lepidoptera
- Family: Tortricidae
- Genus: Hynhamia
- Species: H. hemileuca

Binomial name
- Hynhamia hemileuca (Meyrick, 1932)

Synonyms
- Tortrix hemileuca Meyrick, 1932

Species of moth

Hynhamia hemileuca is a species of moth of the family Tortricidae. It is found in Colombia.
