= Auratonota polymaculata =

Scientific classification
- Kingdom: Animalia
- Phylum: Arthropoda
- Clade: Pancrustacea
- Class: Insecta
- Order: Lepidoptera
- Family: Tortricidae
- Genus: Auratonota
- Species: A. polymaculata

Binomial name
- Auratonota polymaculata Razowski & Wojtusiak, 2008

Species of moth

Auratonota polymaculata is a species of moth of the family Tortricidae. It is found in Ecuador.

The wingspan is about 36 mm (1.4 in).
