= Archimaga pyractis =

Scientific classification
- Kingdom: Animalia
- Phylum: Arthropoda
- Class: Insecta
- Order: Lepidoptera
- Family: Tortricidae
- Genus: Archimaga
- Species: A. pyractis

Binomial name
- Archimaga pyractis Meyrick, 1905

Species of moth

Archimaga pyractis is a species of moth of the family Tortricidae. It is found in Sri Lanka.
