= Auratonota splendida =

Scientific classification
- Kingdom: Animalia
- Phylum: Arthropoda
- Clade: Pancrustacea
- Class: Insecta
- Order: Lepidoptera
- Family: Tortricidae
- Genus: Auratonota
- Species: A. splendida

Binomial name
- Auratonota splendida Razowski & Becker, 2000

Species of moth

Auratonota splendida is a species of moth of the family Tortricidae. It is found in Ecuador.

The wingspan is 23.5 mm.
