= Pseudocomotis razowskii =

Scientific classification
- Kingdom: Animalia
- Phylum: Arthropoda
- Class: Insecta
- Order: Lepidoptera
- Family: Tortricidae
- Genus: Pseudocomotis
- Species: P. razowskii

Binomial name
- Pseudocomotis razowskii Pelz, 2004

Species of moth

Pseudocomotis razowskii is a species of moth of the family Tortricidae. It is found in Ecuador.
