= Auratonota flora =

Scientific classification
- Kingdom: Animalia
- Phylum: Arthropoda
- Clade: Pancrustacea
- Class: Insecta
- Order: Lepidoptera
- Family: Tortricidae
- Genus: Auratonota
- Species: A. flora

Binomial name
- Auratonota flora Razowski & Becker, 2000

Species of moth

Auratonota flora is a species of moth of the family Tortricidae. It is found in Ecuador (Tungurahua Province and Sucumbíos Province).

The wingspan is about 19 mm.
