= Auratonota hydrogramma =

Scientific classification
- Kingdom: Animalia
- Phylum: Arthropoda
- Class: Insecta
- Order: Lepidoptera
- Family: Tortricidae
- Genus: Auratonota
- Species: A. hydrogramma

Binomial name
- Auratonota hydrogramma (Meyrick, 1912)

Synonyms
- Cnephasia hydrogramma Meyrick, 1912; Eulia hydrogramma

Species of moth

Auratonota hydrogramma is a species of moth of the family Tortricidae. It is widespread throughout the lowlands Neotropics, from Costa Rica to Bahia on the Atlantic coast of eastern Brazil.
