= Leurogyia =

Scientific classification
- Domain: Eukaryota
- Kingdom: Animalia
- Phylum: Arthropoda
- Class: Insecta
- Order: Lepidoptera
- Family: Tortricidae
- Tribe: Chlidanotini
- Genus: Leurogyia; Common, 1965

Species
- See text

Genus of tortrix moths

Leurogyia is a genus of moths belonging to the family Tortricidae.

== Species ==
- Leurogyia peristictum Common, 1965
