= Pseudocomotis scardiana =

Scientific classification
- Domain: Eukaryota
- Kingdom: Animalia
- Phylum: Arthropoda
- Class: Insecta
- Order: Lepidoptera
- Family: Tortricidae
- Genus: Pseudocomotis
- Species: P. scardiana

Binomial name
- Pseudocomotis scardiana (Dognin, 1905)

Synonyms
- Orthotaenia scardiana Dognin, 1905; Eulia scardiana; Orthocomotis scardiana

Species of moth

Pseudocomotis scardiana is a species of moth of the family Tortricidae. It is found from Ecuador to Peru.
