= Maldonado =

Maldonado may refer to:

- Maldonado (surname)
- Maldonado Department of Uruguay
  - Maldonado, Uruguay, the capital city of Maldonado Department
- Pedro Vicente Maldonado (canton), Ecuador
- Maldonado Base, Ecuadorian research base in Antarctica
- Puerto Maldonado, a city in Peru
- Maldonado Stream, a stream in Buenos Aires, Argentina

== See also ==
- Maldonada (disambiguation)
