= Auratonota chlamydophora =

Scientific classification
- Domain: Eukaryota
- Kingdom: Animalia
- Phylum: Arthropoda
- Class: Insecta
- Order: Lepidoptera
- Family: Tortricidae
- Genus: Auratonota
- Species: A. chlamydophora

Binomial name
- Auratonota chlamydophora Razowski & Wojtusiak, 2006

Species of moth

Auratonota chlamydophora is a species of moth of the family Tortricidae and is endemic to Ecuador.

The wingspan is about 17 millimetres (0.67 in).
