= Auratonota ovulus =

Scientific classification
- Kingdom: Animalia
- Phylum: Arthropoda
- Class: Insecta
- Order: Lepidoptera
- Family: Tortricidae
- Genus: Auratonota
- Species: A. ovulus

Binomial name
- Auratonota ovulus Razowski & Wojtusiak, 2008

Species of moth

Auratonota ovulus is a species of moth of the family Tortricidae. It is found in Ecuador.

The wingspan is about 19 mm.
