= Caenognosis incisa =

Scientific classification
- Kingdom: Animalia
- Phylum: Arthropoda
- Class: Insecta
- Order: Lepidoptera
- Family: Tortricidae
- Genus: Caenognosis
- Species: C. incisa

Binomial name
- Caenognosis incisa Walsingham in Andrews, 1900

Synonyms
- Epirrhoeca neoris Meyrick, 1911

Species of moth

Caenognosis incisa is a species of moth of the family Tortricidae. It is found on the Philippines and Christmas Island, as well as in Australia (Queensland).
