= Idiothauma africanum =

Scientific classification
- Domain: Eukaryota
- Kingdom: Animalia
- Phylum: Arthropoda
- Class: Insecta
- Order: Lepidoptera
- Family: Tortricidae
- Genus: Idiothauma
- Species: I. africanum

Binomial name
- Idiothauma africanum Walsingham, 1897

Species of moth

Idiothauma africanum is a species of moth of the family Tortricidae. It is found in Cameroon, the Republic of Congo, Equatorial Guinea and Gabon.
