= Auratonota chemillena =

Scientific classification
- Kingdom: Animalia
- Phylum: Arthropoda
- Class: Insecta
- Order: Lepidoptera
- Family: Tortricidae
- Genus: Auratonota
- Species: A. chemillena

Binomial name
- Auratonota chemillena Razowski & Wojtusiak, 2010

Species of moth

Auratonota chemillena is a species of moth of the family Tortricidae. It is found in Peru.

The wingspan is about 20.5 mm.
