= Auratonota meion =

Scientific classification
- Kingdom: Animalia
- Phylum: Arthropoda
- Class: Insecta
- Order: Lepidoptera
- Family: Tortricidae
- Genus: Auratonota
- Species: A. meion

Binomial name
- Auratonota meion Razowski & Wojtusiak, 2011

Species of moth

Auratonota meion is a species of moth of the family Tortricidae. It is found in the Western Cordillera in Colombia.

The wingspan is about 12.5 mm.
