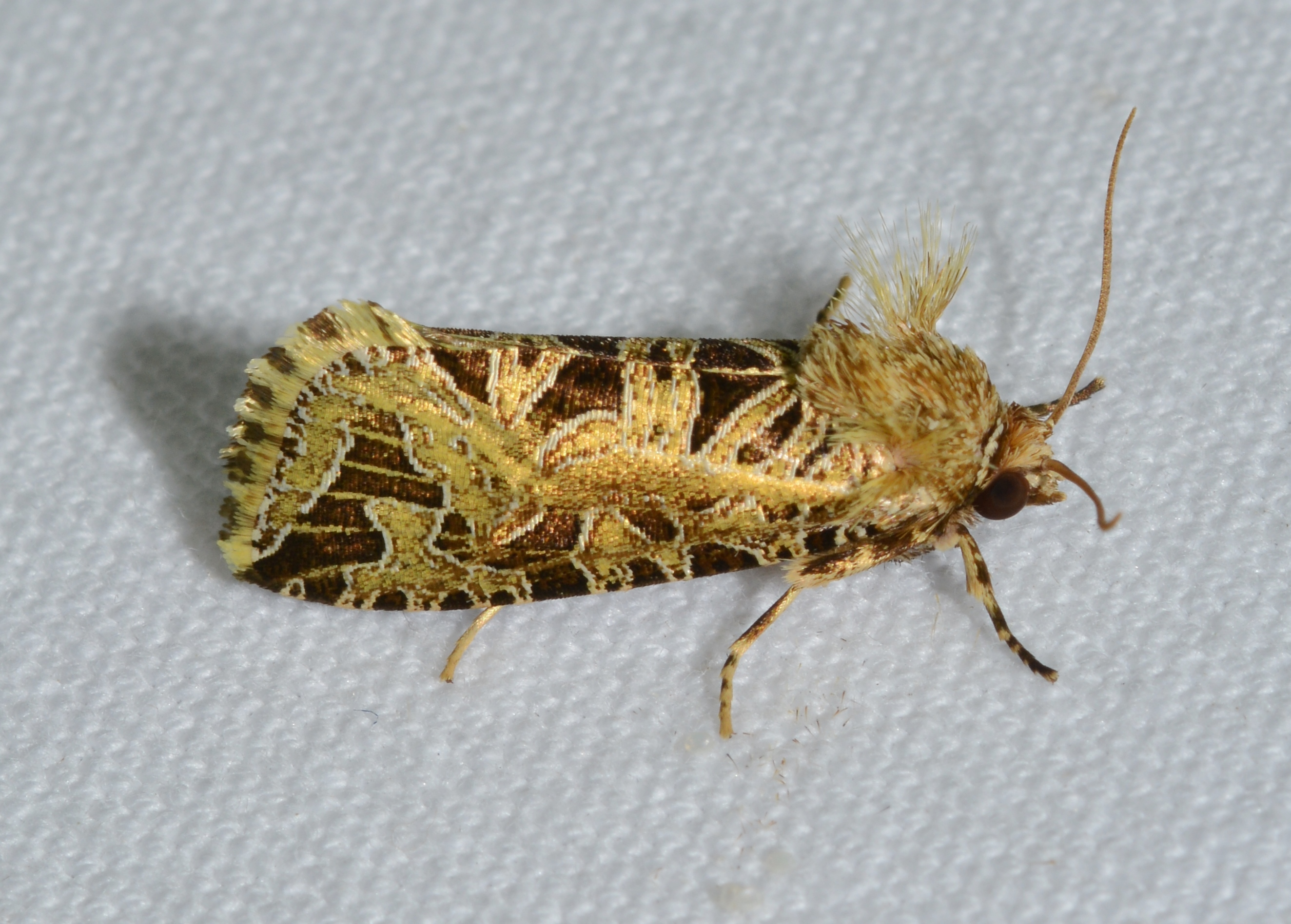
- An Auratonota species from Costa Rica.

Scientific classification
- Kingdom: Animalia
- Phylum: Arthropoda
- Clade: Pancrustacea
- Class: Insecta
- Order: Lepidoptera
- Family: Tortricidae
- Tribe: Chlidanotini
- Genus: Auratonota; Razowski, 1987

Species
- See text

Synonyms
- Aurantonota Powell, Razowski & Brown, 1995

= Auratonota =

Genus of tortrix moths

Auratonota is a genus of moths belonging to the family Tortricidae.

== Species ==
- Auratonota aenigmatica Meyrick, 1912
- Auratonota angustovalva Razowski & Pelz, 2007
- Auratonota aporema Dognin, 1912
- Auratonota argentana Razowski & Pelz, 2007
- Auratonota aurantica Busck, 1920
- Auratonota auriferana Razowski & Pelz, 2007
- Auratonota auriginea Razowski & Becker, 2000
- Auratonota aurochra Razowski & Wojtusiak, 2006
- Auratonota bacata Razowski & Pelz, 2007
- Auratonota badiaurea Razowski & Becker, 2000
- Auratonota brachuncus Razowski & Pelz, 2007
- Auratonota caeruleata Razowski & Pelz, 2007
- Auratonota caliginosa Razowski & Pelz, 2007
- Auratonota cataponera Razowski & Becker, 2000
- Auratonota chemillena Razowski & Wojtusiak, 2010
- Auratonota chlamydophora Razowski & Wojtusiak, 2006
- Auratonota clasmata Razowski & Becker, 2000
- Auratonota croceana Razowski & Pelz, 2007
- Auratonota cubana Razowski & Becker, 2000
- Auratonota dispersa Brown, 1990
- Auratonota dominica Brown, 1993
- Auratonota effera Razowski & Becker, 2000
- Auratonota exoptata Razowski & Becker, 2000
- Auratonota fasciata Razowski & Pelz, 2007
- Auratonota flora Razowski & Becker, 2000
- Auratonota foederata Razowski & Becker, 2000
- Auratonota hyacinthina Meyrick, 1912
- Auratonota hydrogramma Meyrick, 1912
- Auratonota magnifica Razowski & Becker, 2000
- Auratonota maldonada Razowski & Becker, 2000
- Auratonota meion Razowski & Wojtusiak, 2011
- Auratonota mimstigmosa Razowski & Wojtusiak, 2011
- Auratonota monochroma Razowski & Becker, 2000
- Auratonota moronana Razowski & Becker, 2000
- Auratonota multifurcata Meyrick, 1932
- Auratonota napoana Razowski & Pelz, 2007
- Auratonota nugax Razowski & Becker, 2000
- Auratonota omorpha Razowski & Becker, 2000
- Auratonota ovulus Razowski & Wojtusiak, 2008
- Auratonota oxytenia Razowski & Becker, 2000
- Auratonota paidosocia Razowski & Becker, 2000
- Auratonota paramaldonada Razowski & Wojtusiak, 2008
- Auratonota petalocrossa Meyrick, 1926
- Auratonota pharata Brown, 2006
- Auratonota pichincha Razowski & Pelz, 2007
- Auratonota polymaculata Razowski & Wojtusiak, 2008
- Auratonota rubromixta Razowski & Wojtusiak, 2008
- Auratonota rutra Razowski & Pelz, 2007
- Auratonota serotina Razowski & Becker, 2000
- Auratonota siskae Razowski & Pelz, 2007
- Auratonota spinivalva Razowksi & Becker, 2000
- Auratonota splendida Razowski & Becker, 2000
- Auratonota stigmosa Razowski & Becker, 2000
- Auratonota sucumbiosa Razowski & Wojtusiak, 2009
- Auratonota tessellata Razowski & Becker, 2000
- Auratonota virgata Razowski & Becker, 2000
- Auratonota yukipana Razowski & Pelz, 2007
