= Gnaphalostoma nivacula =

Scientific classification
- Kingdom: Animalia
- Phylum: Arthropoda
- Class: Insecta
- Order: Lepidoptera
- Family: Tortricidae
- Genus: Gnaphalostoma
- Species: G. nivacula

Binomial name
- Gnaphalostoma nivacula Diakonoff, 1976

Species of moth

Gnaphalostoma nivacula is a species of moth of the family Tortricidae. It is found in Nepal.
