= Auratonota magnifica =

Scientific classification
- Kingdom: Animalia
- Phylum: Arthropoda
- Clade: Pancrustacea
- Class: Insecta
- Order: Lepidoptera
- Family: Tortricidae
- Genus: Auratonota
- Species: A. magnifica

Binomial name
- Auratonota magnifica Razowski & Becker, 2000

Species of moth

Auratonota magnifica is a species of moth of the family Tortricidae. It is found in Venezuela.

The wingspan is about 33 mm.
