= Monortha =

Scientific classification
- Kingdom: Animalia
- Phylum: Arthropoda
- Clade: Pancrustacea
- Class: Insecta
- Order: Lepidoptera
- Family: Tortricidae
- Subfamily: Chlidanotinae
- Genus: Monortha; Razowski & Becker, 1981

Species
- See text

Genus of tortrix moths

Monortha is a genus of moths belonging to the family Tortricidae.

== Species ==
- Monortha bellavistana Razowski & Pelz, 2007
- Monortha corusca Meyrick, 1912
- Monortha funestra Razowski & Becker, 1981
- Monortha illaqueata Meyrick, 1917
- Monortha jurumbaino Razowski & Pelz, 2007
- Monortha pleodontia Razowski, 1987
- Monortha povedai Razowski & Pelz, 2007
- Monortha procera Razowski, 2004
