= Idiothauma =

Scientific classification
- Kingdom: Animalia
- Phylum: Arthropoda
- Class: Insecta
- Order: Lepidoptera
- Family: Tortricidae
- Tribe: Hilarographini
- Genus: Idiothauma; Walsingham, 1897

Species
- See text

Genus of tortrix moths

Idiothauma is a genus of moths belonging to the family Tortricidae.

== Species ==
- Idiothauma africanum Walsingham, 1897
- Idiothauma malgassicella Viette, 1958
- Idiothauma rigatiella Ghesquire, 1940
