= Utrivalva melitocrossa =

Scientific classification
- Kingdom: Animalia
- Phylum: Arthropoda
- Class: Insecta
- Order: Lepidoptera
- Family: Tortricidae
- Genus: Utrivalva
- Species: U. melitocrossa

Binomial name
- Utrivalva melitocrossa (Meyrick, 1926)

Synonyms
- Eulia melitocrossa Meyrick, 1926

Species of moth

Utrivalva melitocrossa is a species of moth of the family Tortricidae. It is found in Colombia.
