= Hynhamia sciodryas =

Scientific classification
- Kingdom: Animalia
- Phylum: Arthropoda
- Class: Insecta
- Order: Lepidoptera
- Family: Tortricidae
- Genus: Hynhamia
- Species: H. sciodryas

Binomial name
- Hynhamia sciodryas (Meyrick, 1926)

Synonyms
- Eulia sciodryas Meyrick, 1926

Species of moth

Hynhamia sciodryas is a species of moth of the family Tortricidae. It is found in Colombia.
