= Auratonota multifurcata =

Scientific classification
- Kingdom: Animalia
- Phylum: Arthropoda
- Class: Insecta
- Order: Lepidoptera
- Family: Tortricidae
- Genus: Auratonota
- Species: A. multifurcata

Binomial name
- Auratonota multifurcata (Meyrick, 1932)

Synonyms
- Eulia multifurcata Meyrick, 1932; Eulia multistrigata Razowski, 1964

Species of moth

Auratonota multifurcata is a species of moth of the family Tortricidae. It is found in Costa Rica.
