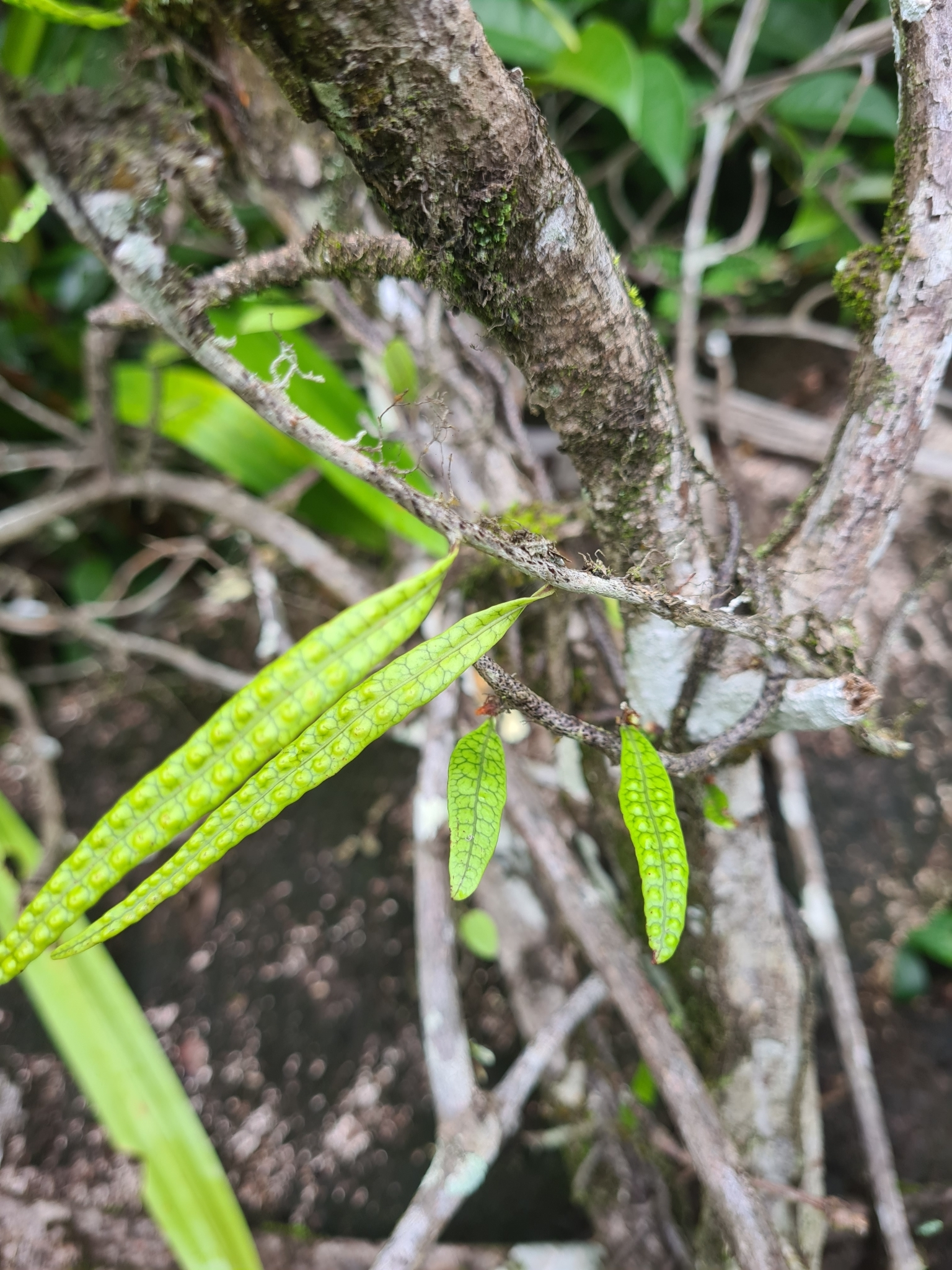

Scientific classification
- Kingdom: Plantae
- Clade: Tracheophytes
- Division: Polypodiophyta
- Class: Polypodiopsida
- Order: Polypodiales
- Suborder: Polypodiineae
- Family: Polypodiaceae
- Genus: Microgramma
- Species: M. lycopodioides

Binomial name
- Microgramma lycopodioides (L.) Copel.

= Microgramma lycopodioides =

Species of plant

Microgramma lycopodioides, also known by its common name clubmoss snakefern is a species from the genus Microgramma.
