= Hynhamia albicorpus =

Scientific classification
- Kingdom: Animalia
- Phylum: Arthropoda
- Clade: Pancrustacea
- Class: Insecta
- Order: Lepidoptera
- Family: Tortricidae
- Genus: Hynhamia
- Species: H. albicorpus

Binomial name
- Hynhamia albicorpus Razowski & Becker, 2011

Species of moth

Hynhamia albicorpus is a species of moth of the family Tortricidae. It is found in São Paulo, Brazil.

The wingspan is about 15 mm.
