= Trymalitis scalifera =

Scientific classification
- Kingdom: Animalia
- Phylum: Arthropoda
- Class: Insecta
- Order: Lepidoptera
- Family: Tortricidae
- Genus: Trymalitis
- Species: T. scalifera

Binomial name
- Trymalitis scalifera Meyrick, 1912

Species of moth

Trymalitis scalifera is a species of moth of the family Tortricidae. It is found in Ethiopia, La Réunion, Madagascar, South Africa and Tanzania.
