= Hynhamia cornutia =

Scientific classification
- Domain: Eukaryota
- Kingdom: Animalia
- Phylum: Arthropoda
- Class: Insecta
- Order: Lepidoptera
- Family: Tortricidae
- Genus: Hynhamia
- Species: H. cornutia

Binomial name
- Hynhamia cornutia Brown, 1990

Species of moth

Hynhamia cornutia is a species of moth of the family Tortricidae. It is found in Colombia.
