= Charitographa =

Scientific classification
- Domain: Eukaryota
- Kingdom: Animalia
- Phylum: Arthropoda
- Class: Insecta
- Order: Lepidoptera
- Family: Tortricidae
- Tribe: Hilarographini
- Genus: Charitographa; Diakonoff, 1979
- Species: C. mikadonia

Binomial name
- Charitographa mikadonia (Stringer, 1930)

Synonyms
- Hilarographa mikadonia Stringer, 1930; Hilarographa micadonis Issiki, in Eakai et al., 1957

Monotypic genus of tortrix moths

Charitographa is a genus of moths belonging to the family Tortricidae. It contains only one species, Charitographa mikadonia, which is found in Japan.
