= Auratonota cubana =

Scientific classification
- Kingdom: Animalia
- Phylum: Arthropoda
- Clade: Pancrustacea
- Class: Insecta
- Order: Lepidoptera
- Family: Tortricidae
- Genus: Auratonota
- Species: A. cubana

Binomial name
- Auratonota cubana Razowski & Becker, 2000

Synonyms
- Auratonota spinivalva cubana Razowski & Becker, 2000

Species of moth

Auratonota cubana is a species of moth of the family Tortricidae. It is found in Cuba.

The wingspan is 18–19 mm.
