= Utrivalva =

Scientific classification
- Kingdom: Animalia
- Phylum: Arthropoda
- Class: Insecta
- Order: Lepidoptera
- Family: Tortricidae
- Tribe: Chlidanotini
- Genus: Utrivalva; Razowski, 1987

Species
- See text

Genus of tortrix moths

Utrivalva is a genus of moths belonging to the family Tortricidae.

== Species ==
- Utrivalva melitocrossa Meyrick, 1926
- Utrivalva usurpata Razowski, 1987
