= Auratonota dominica =

Scientific classification
- Domain: Eukaryota
- Kingdom: Animalia
- Phylum: Arthropoda
- Class: Insecta
- Order: Lepidoptera
- Family: Tortricidae
- Genus: Auratonota
- Species: A. dominica

Binomial name
- Auratonota dominica Brown, 1993

Species of moth

Auratonota dominica is a species of moth of the family Tortricidae. It is endemic to Dominica.
