= Monortha pleodontia =

Scientific classification
- Kingdom: Animalia
- Phylum: Arthropoda
- Class: Insecta
- Order: Lepidoptera
- Family: Tortricidae
- Genus: Monortha
- Species: M. pleodontia

Binomial name
- Monortha pleodontia Razowski, 1987

Species of moth

Monortha pleodontia is a species of moth of the family Tortricidae. It is found in Costa Rica and Panama.
