= Hynhamia micruncus =

Scientific classification
- Kingdom: Animalia
- Phylum: Arthropoda
- Class: Insecta
- Order: Lepidoptera
- Family: Tortricidae
- Genus: Hynhamia
- Species: H. micruncus

Binomial name
- Hynhamia micruncus Razowski & Pelz, 2007

Species of moth

Hynhamia micruncus is a species of moth of the family Tortricidae. It is found in Ecuador.

The wingspan is about 23 mm.
