= Utrivalva usurpata =

Scientific classification
- Kingdom: Animalia
- Phylum: Arthropoda
- Class: Insecta
- Order: Lepidoptera
- Family: Tortricidae
- Genus: Utrivalva
- Species: U. usurpata

Binomial name
- Utrivalva usurpata Razowski, 1987

Species of moth

Utrivalva usurpata is a species of moth of the family Tortricidae. It is found in Guatemala.
