= Metrernis tencatei =

Scientific classification
- Kingdom: Animalia
- Phylum: Arthropoda
- Class: Insecta
- Order: Lepidoptera
- Family: Tortricidae
- Genus: Metrernis
- Species: M. tencatei

Binomial name
- Metrernis tencatei Diakonoff, 1957

Species of moth

Metrernis tencatei is a species of moth of the family Tortricidae. It is found on Ternate Island in eastern Indonesia.
