= Auratonota aurantica =

Scientific classification
- Domain: Eukaryota
- Kingdom: Animalia
- Phylum: Arthropoda
- Class: Insecta
- Order: Lepidoptera
- Family: Tortricidae
- Genus: Auratonota
- Species: A. aurantica

Binomial name
- Auratonota aurantica (Busck, 1920)

Synonyms
- Epagoge aurantica Busck, 1920; Auratonota autantica Razowski, 1987; Auratonota urantica Razowski, 1987

Species of moth

Auratonota aurantica is a species of moth of the family Tortricidae. It is found in Costa Rica.
