= Monortha illaqueata =

Scientific classification
- Kingdom: Animalia
- Phylum: Arthropoda
- Class: Insecta
- Order: Lepidoptera
- Family: Tortricidae
- Genus: Monortha
- Species: M. illaqueata

Binomial name
- Monortha illaqueata (Meyrick, 1917)

Synonyms
- Capua illaqueata Meyrick, 1917; Capua llaquaeta Clarke, 1958

Species of moth

Monortha illaqueata is a species of moth of the family Tortricidae. It is found in French Guiana.
