= Trymalitis macarista =

Scientific classification
- Kingdom: Animalia
- Phylum: Arthropoda
- Class: Insecta
- Order: Lepidoptera
- Family: Tortricidae
- Genus: Trymalitis
- Species: T. macarista

Binomial name
- Trymalitis macarista Meyrick, 1934

Species of moth

Trymalitis macarista is a species of moth of the family Tortricidae. It is found on Fiji.
