= Auratonota pharata =

Scientific classification
- Domain: Eukaryota
- Kingdom: Animalia
- Phylum: Arthropoda
- Class: Insecta
- Order: Lepidoptera
- Family: Tortricidae
- Genus: Auratonota
- Species: A. pharata

Binomial name
- Auratonota pharata Brown, 2006

Species of moth

Auratonota pharata is a species of moth of the family Tortricidae described by John W. Brown in 2006. It is found in Costa Rica, Panama, Venezuela, Guyana and French Guiana.

The length of the forewings is 11.5–12.9 millimetres (0.45–0.51 in) for males and 12.2–14.1 millimetres (0.48–0.56 in) for females. Adults have been recorded on wing from January to March and from June to November.

== Etymology ==
The specific name is derived from the word pharate (meaning cloaked or hidden).
