= Picroxena scorpiura =

Scientific classification
- Kingdom: Animalia
- Phylum: Arthropoda
- Class: Insecta
- Order: Lepidoptera
- Family: Tortricidae
- Genus: Picroxena
- Species: P. scorpiura

Binomial name
- Picroxena scorpiura Meyrick, 1921

Species of moth

Picroxena scorpiura is a species of moth of the family Tortricidae. It is found on Java.
