= Hynhamia lasgralariae =

Scientific classification
- Kingdom: Animalia
- Phylum: Arthropoda
- Class: Insecta
- Order: Lepidoptera
- Family: Tortricidae
- Genus: Hynhamia
- Species: H. lasgralariae

Binomial name
- Hynhamia lasgralariae Razowski & Pelz, 2007

Species of moth

Hynhamia lasgralariae is a species of moth of the family Tortricidae. It is found in Ecuador.

The wingspan is 15.5 mm for males and 16 mm for females.

== Etymology ==
The species name refers to the type locality, the Cloudforest Reserve Las Gralarias.
