= Daulocnema epicharis =

Scientific classification
- Domain: Eukaryota
- Kingdom: Animalia
- Phylum: Arthropoda
- Class: Insecta
- Order: Lepidoptera
- Family: Tortricidae
- Genus: Daulocnema
- Species: D. epicharis

Binomial name
- Daulocnema epicharis Common, 1965

Species of moth

Daulocnema epicharis is a species of moth of the family Tortricidae. It is found in Queensland, Australia.
