= Electracma =

Scientific classification
- Kingdom: Animalia
- Phylum: Arthropoda
- Clade: Pancrustacea
- Class: Insecta
- Order: Lepidoptera
- Family: Tortricidae
- Tribe: Chlidanotini
- Genus: Electracma; Meyrick, 1906

Species
- See text

Genus of tortrix moths

Electracma is a genus of moths belonging to the family Tortricidae.

Larvae of the South African species Electracma minyops can be seen inhabiting the galls of white milkwood (Sideroxylon inerme).

== Species ==
There are currently two species belonging to this genus. They are listed below:

- Electracma hemichroa Meyrick, 1906
- Electracma minyops Razowski & Giliomee, 2014
