= Hynhamia ochroleuca =

Scientific classification
- Kingdom: Animalia
- Phylum: Arthropoda
- Class: Insecta
- Order: Lepidoptera
- Family: Tortricidae
- Genus: Hynhamia
- Species: H. ochroleuca

Binomial name
- Hynhamia ochroleuca Razowski & Brown, 2004

Species of moth

Hynhamia ochroleuca is a species of moth of the family Tortricidae. It is found in Costa Rica.

The length of the forewings is 11.5–13 mm for males and 11.5–15 mm for females.

The species was reared from a pupa found on the bark of Quercus oleodies.
