= Hynhamia brunana =

Scientific classification
- Domain: Eukaryota
- Kingdom: Animalia
- Phylum: Arthropoda
- Class: Insecta
- Order: Lepidoptera
- Family: Tortricidae
- Genus: Hynhamia
- Species: H. brunana

Binomial name
- Hynhamia brunana Brown, 1990

Species of moth

Hynhamia brunana is a species of moth of the family Tortricidae. It is found in Peru.
