= Nexosa picturata =

Scientific classification
- Kingdom: Animalia
- Phylum: Arthropoda
- Class: Insecta
- Order: Lepidoptera
- Family: Tortricidae
- Genus: Nexosa
- Species: N. picturata

Binomial name
- Nexosa picturata (Meyrick, 1912)

Synonyms
- Mictopsichia picturata Meyrick, 1912

Species of moth

Nexosa picturata is a species of moth of the family Tortricidae. It is found in Assam, India.
