= Hynhamia =

Scientific classification
- Kingdom: Animalia
- Phylum: Arthropoda
- Clade: Pancrustacea
- Class: Insecta
- Order: Lepidoptera
- Family: Tortricidae
- Subfamily: Chlidanotinae
- Genus: Hynhamia; Razowski, 1987

Species
- See text

Synonyms
- Paraneulia Razowski & Becker, 1999

Genus of tortrix moths

Hynhamia is a genus of moths belonging to the family Tortricidae.

== Species ==
- Hynhamia albicorpus Razowski & Becker, 2011
- Hynhamia bahiana Razowski & Becker, 2011
- Hynhamia brunana Brown, 1990
- Hynhamia cerina (Razowski & Becker, 1999)
- Hynhamia conceptionana Razowski & Pelz, 2007
- Hynhamia cornutia Brown, 1990
- Hynhamia decora Razowski & Pelz, 2007
- Hynhamia diversa Razowski & Becker, 2011
- Hynhamia hemileuca Meyrick, 1932
- Hynhamia lasgralariae Razowski & Pelz, 2007
- Hynhamia microsocia Razowski, 1999
- Hynhamia micruncus Razowski & Pelz, 2007
- Hynhamia nigropunctana Razowski & Pelz, 2007
- Hynhamia obscurana Razowski & Pelz, 2007
- Hynhamia ochroleuca Razowski & Brown, 2004
- Hynhamia patatea Razowski & Becker, 2011
- Hynhamia perampla Razowski & Becker, 1999
- Hynhamia runtuana Razowski & Wojtusiak, 2009
- Hynhamia sciodryas (Meyrick, 1926)
