= Microgramma tuberosa =

Conservation status
- Endangered (IUCN 3.1)

Scientific classification
- Kingdom: Plantae
- Clade: Tracheophytes
- Division: Polypodiophyta
- Class: Polypodiopsida
- Order: Polypodiales
- Suborder: Polypodiineae
- Family: Polypodiaceae
- Genus: Microgramma
- Species: M. tuberosa

Binomial name
- Microgramma tuberosa (Maxon) Lellinger

Synonyms
- Polypodium tuberosum Maxon; Solanopteris tuberosum (Maxon) Rauh

Species of fern

Microgramma tuberosa is a species of fern in the family Polypodiaceae. It is endemic to Ecuador. It is threatened by habitat loss.

== Description ==
The rhizome is 2 to 3.5 millimeters (0.079 to 0.14 in) thick and shaped like a rope, branching occasionally. It bears small, firm scales appressed to the surface, densely covering it and occasionally overlapping. They are chestnut brown in color, with pale borders that are erose to denticulate. They vary considerably in form and shape, from almost round and 0.5 millimeters (0.02 in) long to ovate with a long-acuminate apex, 1.5 millimeters (0.059 in) (occasionally 2.0 millimeters (0.079 in)) long, and generally persist on the rhizome when mature. Like other members of subgenus Solanopteris, the rhizome bears hollow tubers, formed from modified branches of the rhizome. These are borne directly on the rhizome, without a stalk, are roughly globular in shape, and are covered by the same scales as the rest of the rhizome.

== Taxonomy ==
The species was first described as Polypodium tuberosum by William Ralph Maxon in 1943. He based his description on two specimens collected near La Chonta, Ecuador by Joseph Nelson Rose et al. in 1918 and deposited at the United States National Herbarium. The name tuberosum presumably refers to the presence of tubers on the rhizome. In 1973, Werner Rauh transferred this species into the genus Solanopteris, erected by Edwin Copeland in 1951 for a similar species, which he distinguished from Microgramma on the basis of the domatia on the rhizome, irregularly netted venation, and the fleshy texture of its leaf blades. David B. Lellinger considered the characters cited by Copeland insufficient to recognize a separate genus, and preferred to recognize Solanopteris as a subgenus of Microgramma. He did not transfer this species to Microgramma until 1984, in preparation for publishing a catalog of fern type specimens at the National Herbarium.

There are relatively few collections of the species, and it may be identical with Microgramma bismarckii, a similar species native to Ecuador and Peru.

== Distribution and habitat ==
Its natural habitat is subtropical or tropical moist lowland forests, where it grows as an epiphyte. It is known only from a few collections in Ecuador.

== Notes and references ==
=== Works cited ===
- Copeland, E. B. (1951). "A New Genus of Ferns". American Fern Journal. 41 (3): 75–76. doi:10.2307/1545045. JSTOR 1545045.
- Jørgensen, Peter Møller; León-Yánez, Susana, eds. (1999). Catalogue of the Vascular Plants of Ecuador. Monographs in Systematic Botany from the Missouri Botanical Garden. Vol. 75. ISBN 0-915279-60-6. OCLC 42094115.
- Lellinger, David B. (1977). "Nomenclatural Notes on Ferns of Costa Rica, Panama and Colombia". American Fern Journal. 67 (2): 58–60. doi:10.2307/1545968. JSTOR 1545968.
- Lellinger, David B. (1984). "New Combinations and Some New Names in Ferns". American Fern Journal. 74 (2): 56–60. doi:10.2307/1546870. JSTOR 1546870.
- León, Blanca; Beltrán, Hamilton (2002). "A New Microgramma Subgenus Solanopteris (Polypodiaceae) from Peru and a New Combination in the Subgenus". Novon. 12 (4): 481–485. doi:10.2307/3393125. JSTOR 3393125.
- Maxon, William R. (1943). "New Tropical American Ferns". American Fern Journal. 33 (4): 133–137. doi:10.2307/1545478. JSTOR 1545478.
- Navarrete, H.; Pitman, N. (2003). "Microgramma tuberosum". IUCN Red List of Threatened Species. 2003 e.T43734A10825087. doi:10.2305/IUCN.UK.2003.RLTS.T43734A10825087.en.
- Rauh, Werner (1973). "Solanopteris Bismarckii Rauh, ein neuer knollenbildender Ameisenfarn aus Zentral-Peru". Tropische und Subtropische Pflanzenwelt (in German). 5: 223–256.
