= Nexosa hexaphala =

Scientific classification
- Kingdom: Animalia
- Phylum: Arthropoda
- Class: Insecta
- Order: Lepidoptera
- Family: Tortricidae
- Genus: Nexosa
- Species: N. hexaphala

Binomial name
- Nexosa hexaphala (Meyrick, 1912)

Synonyms
- Mictopsichia hexaphala Meyrick, 1912

Species of moth

Nexosa hexaphala is a species of moth of the family Tortricidae. It is found in Sri Lanka and Vietnam.
