= Monortha corusca =

Scientific classification
- Kingdom: Animalia
- Phylum: Arthropoda
- Class: Insecta
- Order: Lepidoptera
- Family: Tortricidae
- Genus: Monortha
- Species: M. corusca

Binomial name
- Monortha corusca (Meyrick, 1912)

Synonyms
- Cnephasia corusca Meyrick, 1912; Eulia corusca

Species of moth

Monortha corusca is a species of moth of the family Tortricidae. It is found in French Guiana.
