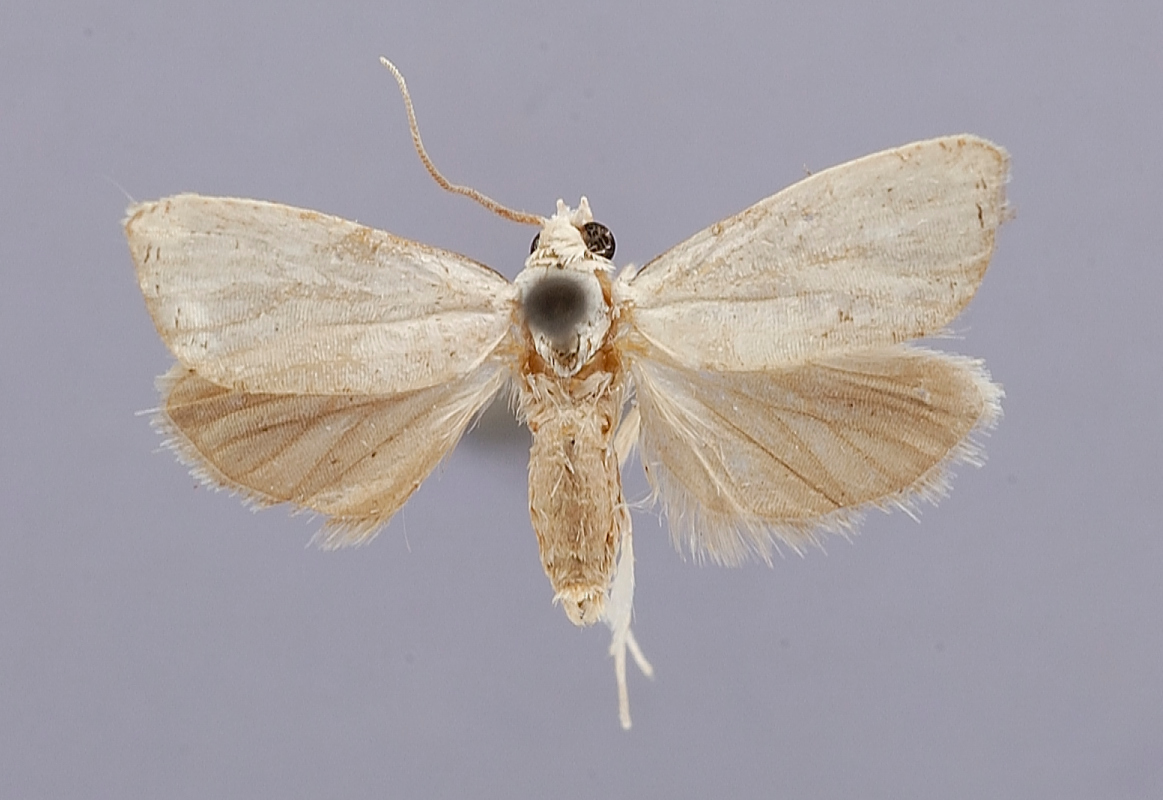

Scientific classification
- Domain: Eukaryota
- Kingdom: Animalia
- Phylum: Arthropoda
- Class: Insecta
- Order: Lepidoptera
- Family: Tortricidae
- Genus: Trymalitis
- Species: T. escharia

Binomial name
- Trymalitis escharia Clarke, 1976

= Trymalitis escharia =

Species of moth

Trymalitis escharia is a species of moth of the family Tortricidae. It is found on Guam.
