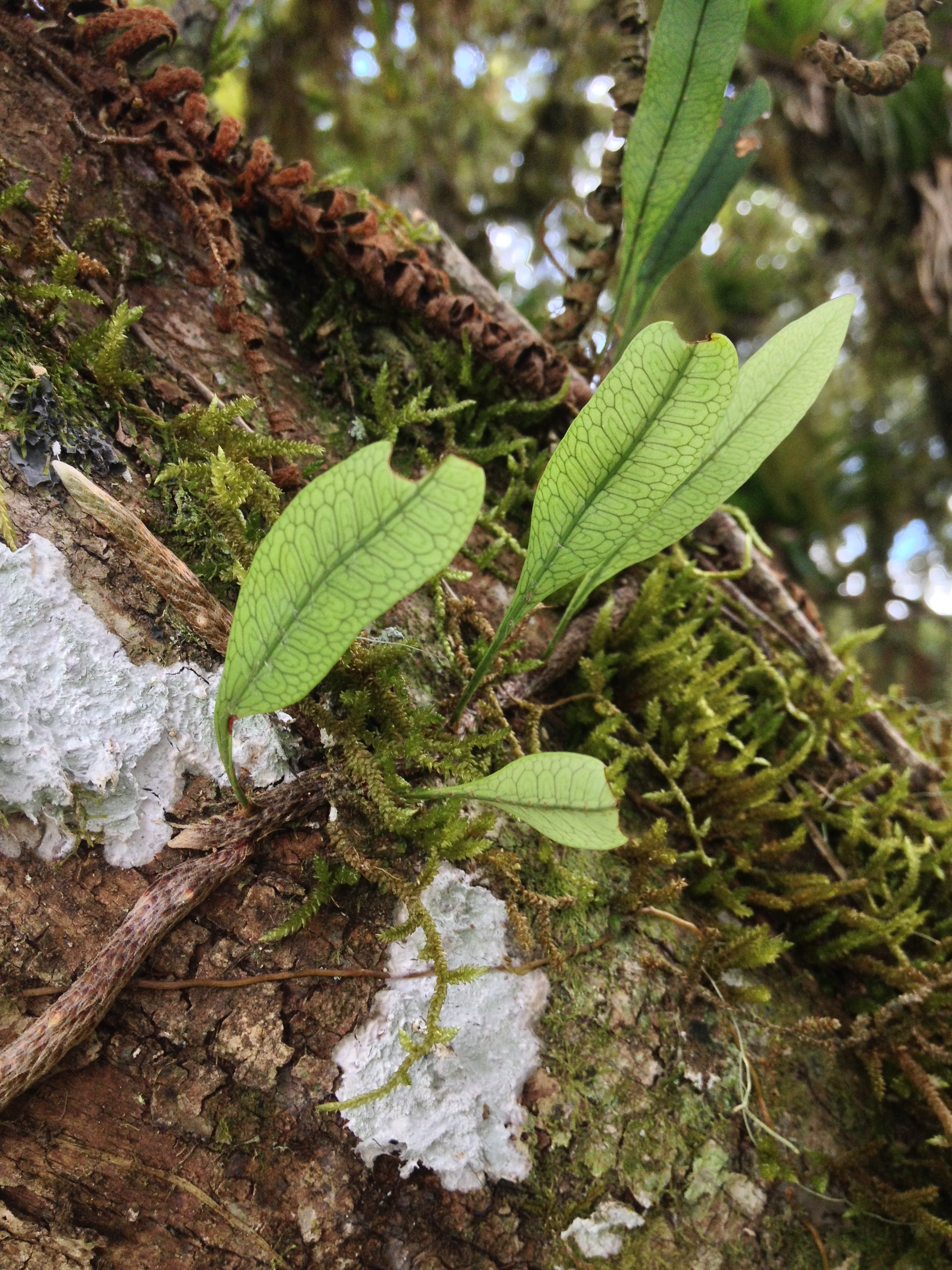

Scientific classification
- Kingdom: Plantae
- Clade: Embryophytes
- Clade: Tracheophytes
- Division: Polypodiophyta
- Class: Polypodiopsida
- Order: Polypodiales
- Suborder: Polypodiineae
- Family: Polypodiaceae
- Genus: Microgramma
- Species: M. squamulosa

Binomial name
- Microgramma squamulosa (Kaulf.) de la Sota, 1961

= Microgramma squamulosa =

Species of plant

Microgramma squamulosa is an epiphytic fern endemic to Brazil, known for its interaction with certain gall-inducing organisms, specifically a moth from the Gelechiidae family.

== Morphology ==
=== Stem ===
The fern exhibits a creeping stem which is densely covered with scales. The organization of the stem allows for clear distinctions between nodes and internodes.

=== Leaves ===
Leaves are present only on the dorsal side of the stem. A notable feature is the characteristic vein pattern visible on the leaves.

=== Roots ===
Adventitious roots emerge solely on the ventral side of the stem.

== Gall formation ==
The term 'gall' refers to abnormal growths on plants resulting from the attacks of certain organisms. Historical data suggests that such interactions between plants and arthropods have been occurring since the Devonian period. The M. squamulosa fern has been studied for its susceptibility to gall formation due to gall-inducing organisms.

=== Interactions with gall-inducing organisms ===
While there are over 15,000 known types of galls found across various species like algae, fungi, and angiosperms, the primary inducer for M. squamulosa is an insect from the Gelechiidae family. This interaction results in the growth of galls, leading to significant changes in the fern's anatomy and structure.

Gall formation instigates changes in the M. squamulosa fern's vascular system. This involves the development of special nutritive tissues and the emergence of sclerified tissues surrounding the gall's larval chamber. These changes are hypothesized to serve as potential defense mechanisms against the invading gall-inducing organism.

The presence of galls on the M. squamulosa may play a pivotal role in the ecosystem. The formation of these galls might offer protection to the plant from the invading organism, but simultaneously, it may also provide a safeguard for the gall-inducing larva against potential predators.
