= Auratonota dispersa =

Scientific classification
- Domain: Eukaryota
- Kingdom: Animalia
- Phylum: Arthropoda
- Class: Insecta
- Order: Lepidoptera
- Family: Tortricidae
- Genus: Auratonota
- Species: A. dispersa

Binomial name
- Auratonota dispersa Brown, 1990

Species of moth

Auratonota dispersa is a species of moth of the family Tortricidae. It is found in Guatemala, Panama and Costa Rica. It has also been recorded from southern Florida in the United States, where it was probably imported with orchids from Guatemala.

The wingspan is 14–15 mm.
