= Nexosa =

Scientific classification
- Domain: Eukaryota
- Kingdom: Animalia
- Phylum: Arthropoda
- Class: Insecta
- Order: Lepidoptera
- Family: Tortricidae
- Tribe: Archipini
- Genus: Nexosa; Diakonoff, 1977

Species
- See text

Genus of tortrix moths

Nexosa is a genus of moths belonging to the family Tortricidae.

== Species ==
- Nexosa aureola Diakonoff, 1977
- Nexosa hexaphala Meyrick, 1912
- Nexosa marmarastra Meyrick, 1932
- Nexosa picturata Meyrick, 1912
