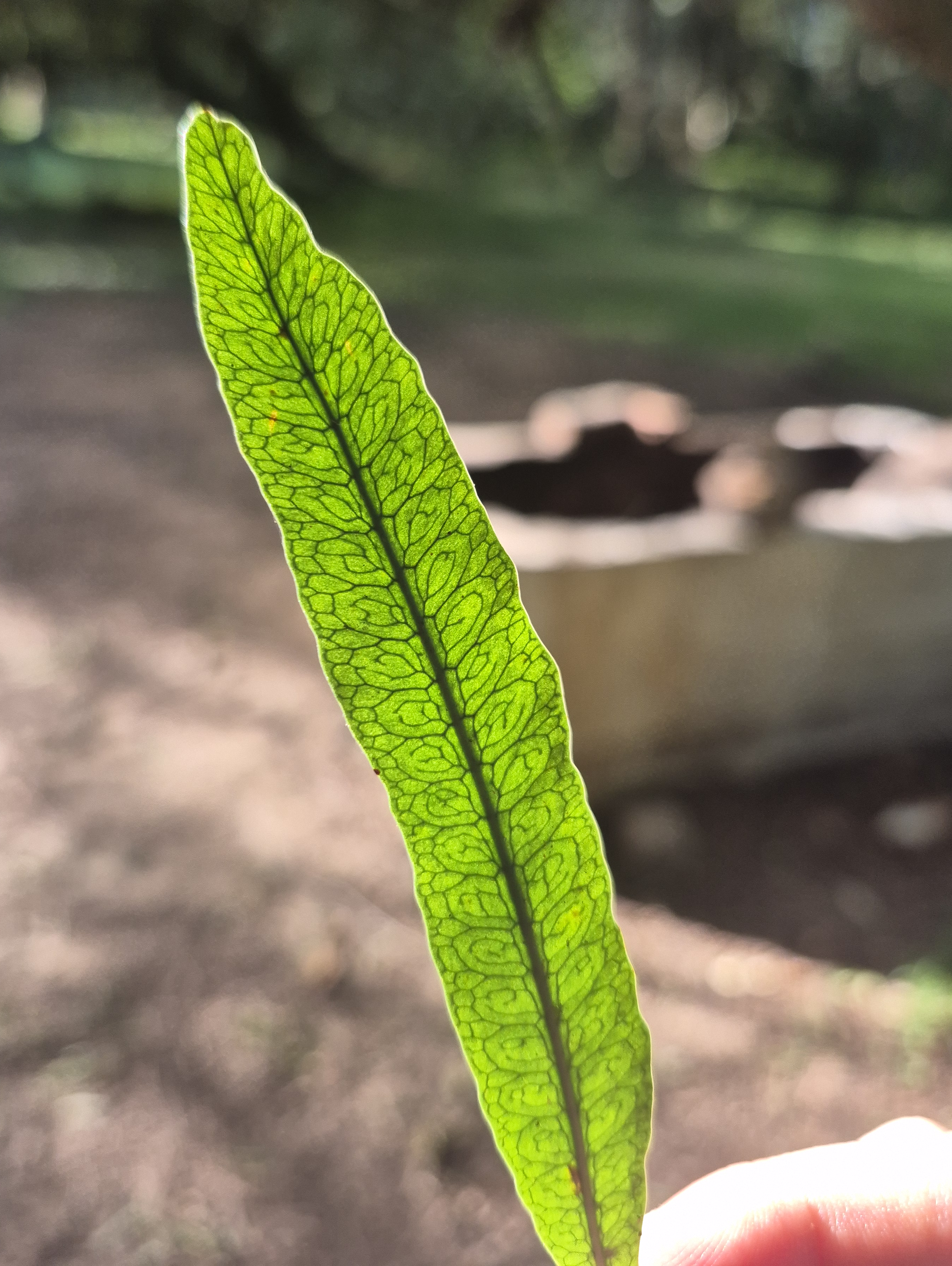
- Microgramma sp., possibly Microgramma squamulosa, showing its venation pattern

Scientific classification
- Kingdom: Plantae
- Clade: Embryophytes
- Clade: Tracheophytes
- Division: Polypodiophyta
- Class: Polypodiopsida
- Order: Polypodiales
- Suborder: Polypodiineae
- Family: Polypodiaceae
- Subfamily: Polypodioideae
- Genus: Microgramma; C.Presl

Species
- See text.

Synonyms
- Anapeltis J.Sm.; Craspedaria Link; Goniophlebium sect. Lopholepis J.Sm.; Lopholepis (J.Sm.) J.Sm.; Microgramma subg. Solanopteris (Copel.) Lellinger; Solanopteris Copel.

= Microgramma (plant) =

Genus of ferns

Microgramma is a genus of ferns in the family Polypodiaceae, subfamily Polypodioideae, according to the Pteridophyte Phylogeny Group classification of 2016 (PPG I). They are commonly known as vine ferns or snakeferns.

== Species ==
The following species are accepted:

Image	Species name	Authority	Distribution
	Microgramma baldwinii	Brade	Northwestern South America & Brazil
	Microgramma bifrons	(Hook.) Lellinger	Western South America
	Microgramma bismarckii	(Rauh) B.León	Western South America
	Microgramma brunei	(Wercklé ex Christ) Lellinger	Northern Latin America & Mexico
	Microgramma cordata	(Desv.) Crabbe	Bolivia
	Microgramma crispata	(Fée) R.M.Tryon & A.F.Tryon	Eastern Brazil
	Microgramma dictyophylla	(Kunze ex Mett.) de la Sota	Northern South America
	Microgramma fosteri	B.León & H.Beltrán	Peru
	Microgramma geminata	(Schrad.) R.M.Tryon & A.F.Tryon	Parts of northern South America
	Microgramma heterophylla	(L.) Wherry	Florida (US), Latin America, recorded from New Zealand & Norway
	Microgramma latevagans	(Maxon & C.Chr.) Lellinger	Peru & Bolivia
	Microgramma lindbergii	(Mett.) Sota	South America
	Microgramma lycopodioides	(L.) Copel.	Central South America to southern Mexico
	Microgramma mauritiana	(Willd.) Tardieu	Central to southern Africa incl. Madagascar, extinct from India
	Microgramma megalophylla	(Desv.) de la Sota	Northern to central South America
	Microgramma microsoroides	Salino, T.E.Almeida & A.R.Sm.	Espírito Santo (Brazil)
	Microgramma × moraviana	L.D.Gómez	Costa Rica
	Microgramma mortoniana	de la Sota	South-central South America
	Microgramma nana ?	(Liebm.) T.E.Almeida	Northern Latin America
	Microgramma nitida	(J.Sm.) A.R.Sm.	Northern Latin America
	Microgramma percussa ?	(Cav.) de la Sota	South America
	Microgramma persicariifolia	C.Presl	Northern South America
	Microgramma piloselloides	(L.) Copel	Central to northern Latin America
	Microgramma recreense	(Hieron.) Lellinger	Ecuador
	Microgramma reptans	(Cav.) A.R.Sm.	Northern South America
	Microgramma rosmarinifolia	(Kunth) R.M.Tryon & A.F.Tryon	Western South America
	Microgramma squamulosa	(Kaulf.) de la Sota, 1961	Brazil
	Microgramma tecta	(Kaulf.) Alston	Central to northern South America
	Microgramma thurnii	(Baker) R.M.Tryon & Stolze	Central to northern South America
	Microgramma tobagensis	(C.Chr.) C.D.Adams & Baksh.-Com	Northwestern South America and Brazil
	Microgramma tuberosa (Note: Spelled tuberosum on the IUCN redlist.) (EN)	(Maxon) Lellinger	Ecuador
	Microgramma ulei	(Hieron.) Stolze	Western South America
	Microgramma vacciniifolia	(Langsd. & Fisch.) Copel.	Central to northern South America
References for this table:

== Distribution ==
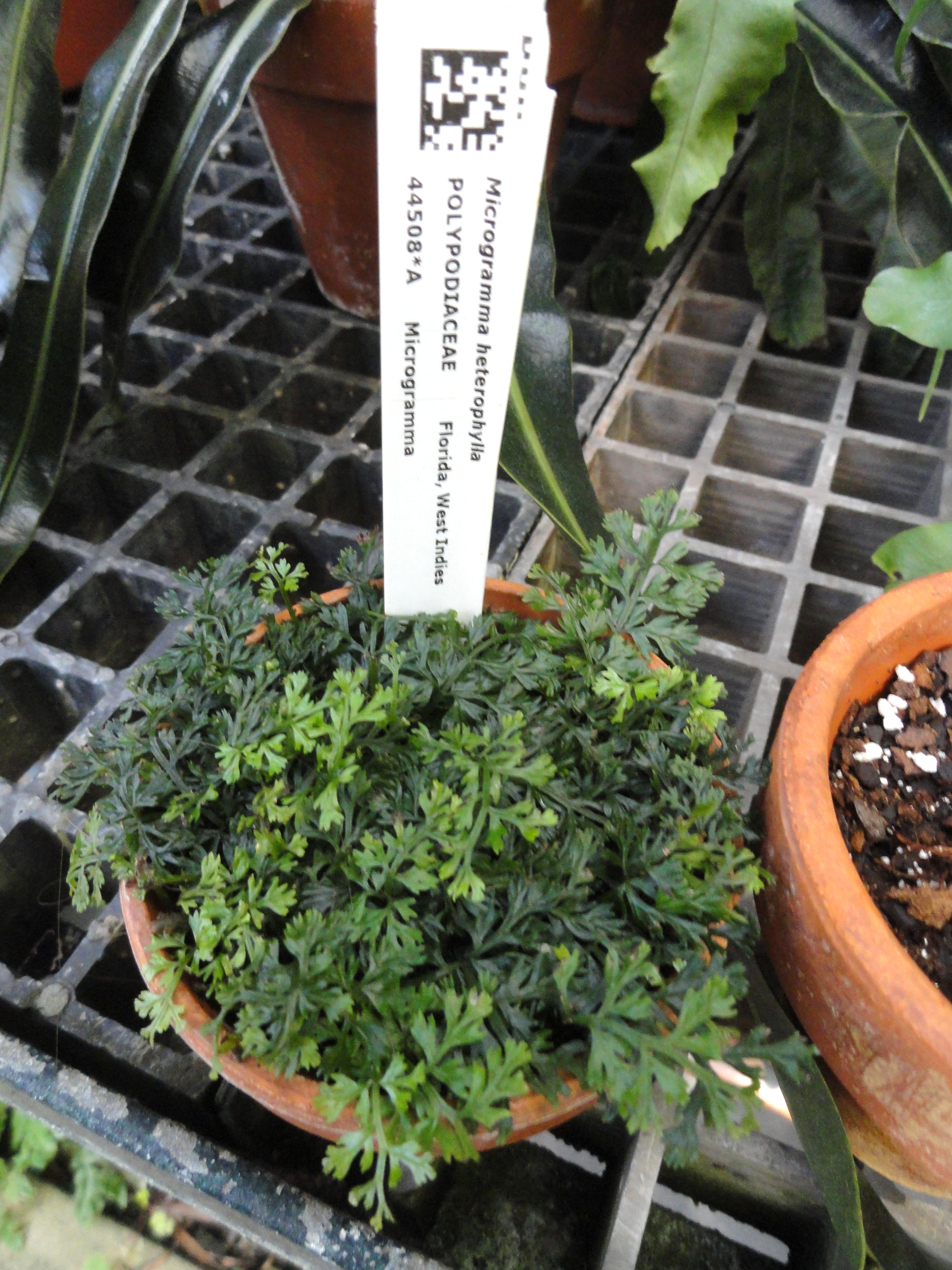
Microgramma heterophylla

Species in the genus are native to tropical ecoregions in the Americas and Africa.

Regions and countries include: Mexico, the Caribbean, Central America, South America (including Argentina and Brazil), tropical Africa, southern Africa, and western Indian Ocean islands.
