= Archimaga philomina =

Scientific classification
- Kingdom: Animalia
- Phylum: Arthropoda
- Class: Insecta
- Order: Lepidoptera
- Family: Tortricidae
- Genus: Archimaga
- Species: A. philomina

Binomial name
- Archimaga philomina Meyrick, 1918

Species of moth

Archimaga philomina is a species of moth of the family Tortricidae. It is found in Assam, India.
