= Auratonota maldonada =

Scientific classification
- Kingdom: Animalia
- Phylum: Arthropoda
- Clade: Pancrustacea
- Class: Insecta
- Order: Lepidoptera
- Family: Tortricidae
- Genus: Auratonota
- Species: A. maldonada

Binomial name
- Auratonota maldonada Razowski & Becker, 2000

Synonyms
- Auratonota petalocrossa maldonada Razowski & Becker, 2000

Species of moth

Auratonota petalocrossa is a species of moth of the family Tortricidae that is found in Ecuador. Its wingspan is of about 26–28 mm.
