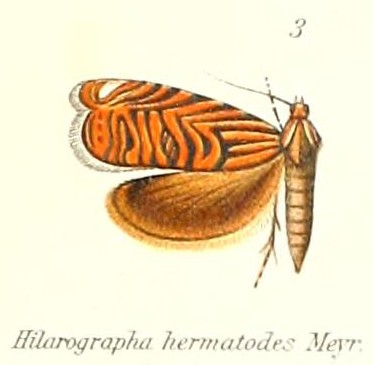
- Hilarographa hermatodes

Scientific classification
- Kingdom: Animalia
- Phylum: Arthropoda
- Clade: Pancrustacea
- Class: Insecta
- Order: Lepidoptera
- Family: Tortricidae
- Subfamily: Chlidanotinae
- Tribe: Hilarographini; Diakonoff, 1977

Genera
- See text

= Hilarographini =

Tribe of moths

Hilarographini is a tribe of moths in the family Tortricidae.

== Genera ==
- Charitographa
- Hilarographa
- Idiothauma
- Mictocommosis
- Thaumatographa
- Tortrimosaica

== Former genera ==
- Nexosa

== Taxonomy ==
The monotypic Embolostoma does not belong in this tribe. Another genus usually included is Irianassa, but this genus belongs in Enarmoniini. One of its species however (Irianassa poecilaspis) does belong to Hilarographini. The genus Nexosa belongs to the Archipini.
