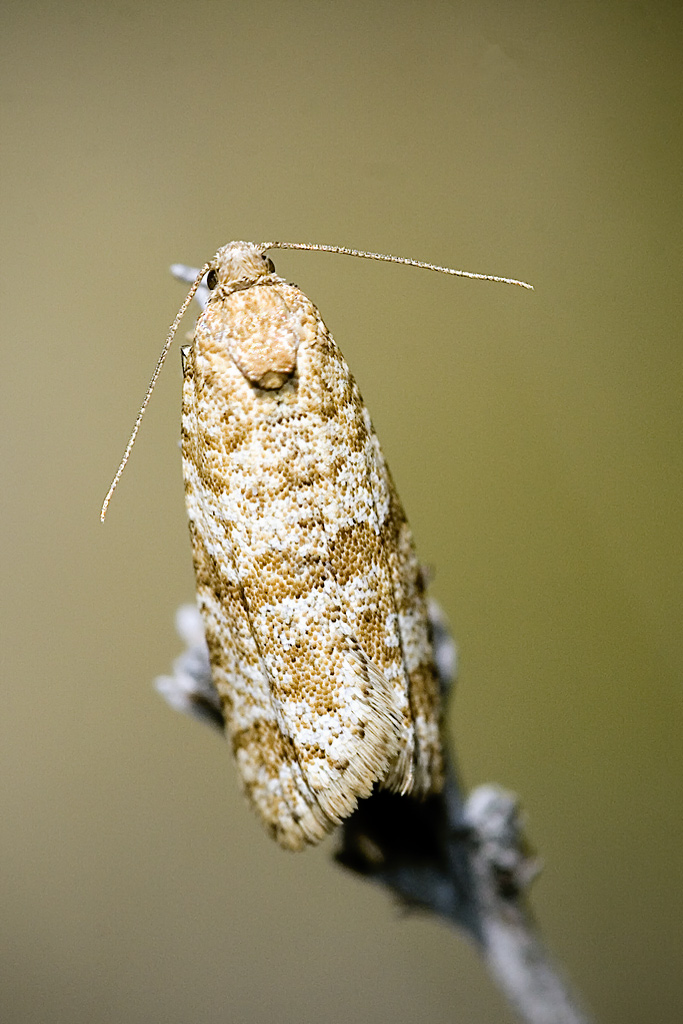
- Isotrias stramentana

Scientific classification
- Kingdom: Animalia
- Phylum: Arthropoda
- Clade: Pancrustacea
- Class: Insecta
- Order: Lepidoptera
- Family: Tortricidae
- Subfamily: Chlidanotinae; Meyrick, 1906

Tribes
- Chlidanotini; Hilarographini; Polyorthini

= Chlidanotinae =

Subfamily of moths

Chlidanotinae is a subfamily of moths that belongs to the family Tortricidae (leafroller moths).
