= List of moths of Australia (Copromorphidae) =

Partial list of Australian moths

This is a list of the Australian species of the family Copromorphidae. It also acts as an index to the species articles and forms part of the full List of moths of Australia.

- Copromorpha lichenitis (Turner, 1916)
- Copromorpha phaeosticta (Turner, 1916)
- Osidryas chersodes (Turner, 1913)
- Osidryas phyllodes Meyrick, 1916
- Phycomorpha prasinochroa (Meyrick, 1906)
- Schistocyttara nebulosa Turner, 1942
- Tanymecica xanthoplaca Turner, 1916
