= Phycomorpha =

Scientific classification
- Kingdom: Animalia
- Phylum: Arthropoda
- Class: Insecta
- Order: Lepidoptera
- Family: Copromorphidae
- Genus: Phycomorpha; Meyrick, 1914

Genus of moths

Phycomorpha is a genus of moths in the family Copromorphidae.

== Species ==
- Phycomorpha bryophylla Meyrick, 1927
- Phycomorpha escharitis Meyrick, 1916
- Phycomorpha metachrysa Meyrick, 1914
- Phycomorpha prasinochroa (Meyrick, 1906) (originally in Copromorpha)

== Alternatively placed here ==
- Phycomorpha argophthalma Meyrick, 1932 (originally in Syncamaris)
- Phycomorpha chalazombra Meyrick, 1938 (originally in Spilogenes)
- Phycomorpha ilyopis Meyrick, 1930 (originally in Saridacma)
- Phycomorpha phlyctaenopa Meyrick, 1926 (originally in Rhopalosetia)
- Phycomorpha simplex Strand, 1915 (originally in Rhynchoferella)
- Phycomorpha syncentra Meyrick, 1916 (originally in Sisyroxena)
