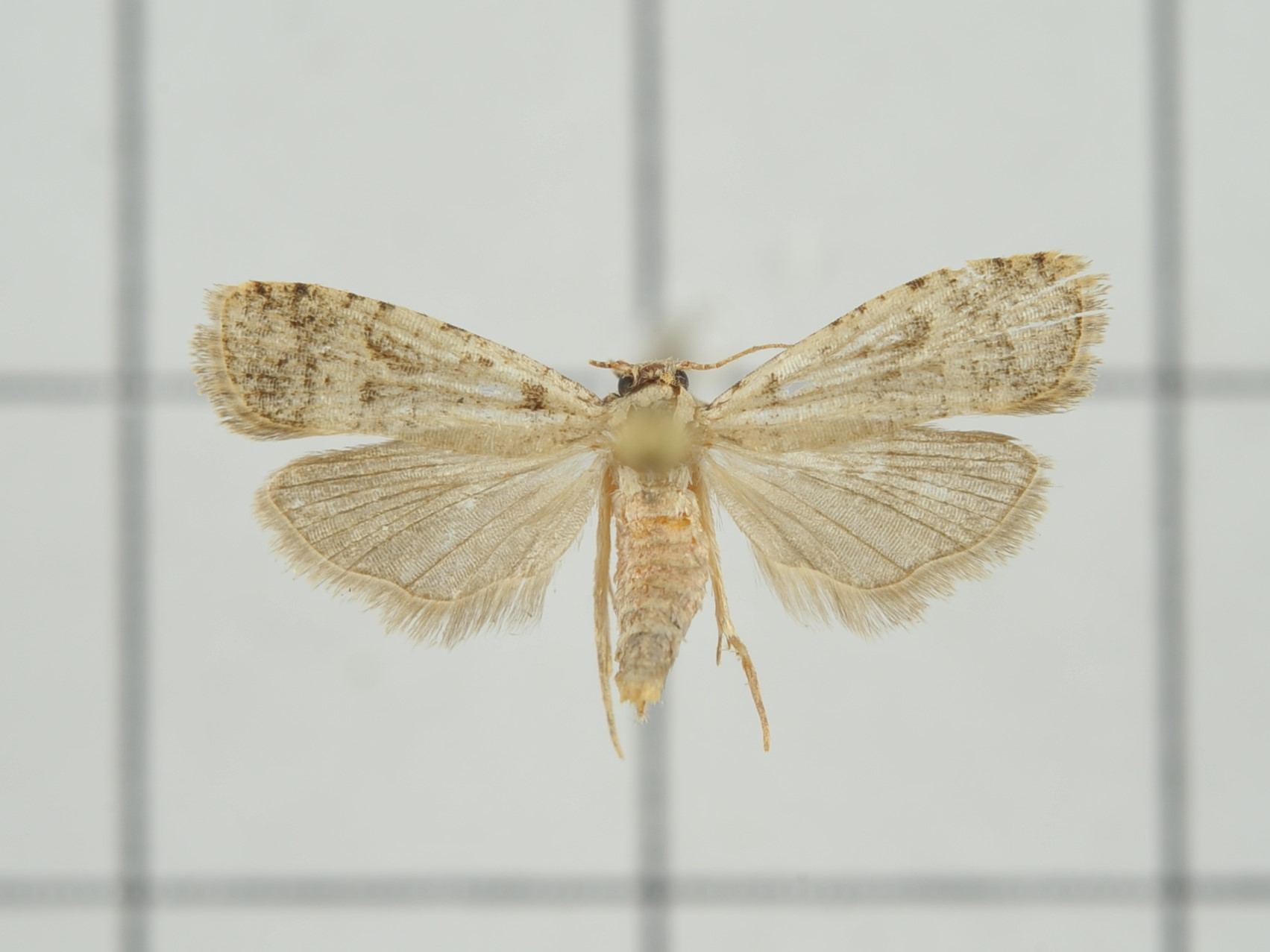

Scientific classification
- Kingdom: Animalia
- Phylum: Arthropoda
- Class: Insecta
- Order: Lepidoptera
- Family: Copromorphidae
- Genus: Copromorpha; Meyrick, 1886

Type species
- Copromorpha gypsota Meyrick, 1886

Synonyms
- Trychnostola Turner, 1916

= Copromorpha =

Genus of moths

Copromorpha is a genus of moths in the family Copromorphidae.

== Species ==
- Copromorpha aeruginea Meyrick, 1917
- Copromorpha bryanthes Meyrick 1926
- Copromorpha cryptochlora Meyrick, 1930
- Copromorpha dialithoma Diakonoff 1967
- Copromorpha efflorescens Meyrick 1906
- †Copromorpha fossilis Jarzembowski 1980 (extinct)
- Copromorpha gypsota Meyrick 1886
- Copromorpha hyphantria Diakonoff 1984
- Copromorpha kijimuna Nasu, Saito & Komai, 2004
- Copromorpha lichenitis (Turner, 1916)
- Copromorpha lignisquama Diakonoff 1954
- Copromorpha macrolepis Diakonoff 1959
- Copromorpha mesobactris Meyrick, 1930
- Copromorpha metallistis Meyrick 1906
- Copromorpha mistharnis Diakonoff 1968
- Copromorpha myrmecias Meyrick 1930
- Copromorpha narcodes Meyrick 1916
- Copromorpha nesographa Meyrick 1926
- Copromorpha orthidias Meyrick 1927
- Copromorpha phaeosticta Turner 1916
- Copromorpha phytochroa Diakonoff 1953
- Copromorpha pleurophanes Meyrick 1905
- Copromorpha pyrrhoscia Meyrick 1935
- Copromorpha roepkei Diakonoff 1953
- Copromorpha smaragdarcha Diakonoff 1967
- Copromorpha tetrarcha Meyrick 1916
- Copromorpha thrombota Meyrick 1916

== Former species ==
- Copromorpha prasinochroa Meyrick 1906
