= Myrmecium =

Myrmecium may refer to:

- Myrmecium (spider), a genus of ant-like spiders from South America (Castianeirinae)
- Myrmecium (sponge) (Goldfuss), a genus of extinct Calcareous sponges
- Myrmēkion, an ancient Greek town at Crimea

== See also ==
- Myrmecia (disambiguation)
- Myrmaecium, a genus of fungi
