= Copromorpha bryanthes =

Scientific classification
- Kingdom: Animalia
- Phylum: Arthropoda
- Class: Insecta
- Order: Lepidoptera
- Family: Copromorphidae
- Genus: Copromorpha
- Species: C. bryanthes

Binomial name
- Copromorpha bryanthes Meyrick, 1926

Species of moth

Copromorpha bryanthes is a moth in the Copromorphidae family. It is found in Sarawak, Malaysia.

The wingspan is about 27 mm. The forewings are light yellowish-green with the costa irregularly marked or spotted dark fuscous. The markings are fuscous, suffusedly mixed or marked dark fuscous on the edges and indistinctly speckled emerald-green. There is a postmedian fascia extending from the dorsum three-fourths across the wing, expanded posteriorly on the dorsum and irregularly confluent with a terminal fascia, the latter preceded above the middle by an oblong spot of dark fuscous irroration. The hindwings are grey.
