= Copromorpha mesobactris =

Scientific classification
- Kingdom: Animalia
- Phylum: Arthropoda
- Class: Insecta
- Order: Lepidoptera
- Family: Copromorphidae
- Genus: Copromorpha
- Species: C. mesobactris

Binomial name
- Copromorpha mesobactris Meyrick, 1930

Synonyms
- Copromorpha mesobractis Viette, 1957

Species of moth

Copromorpha mesobactris is a moth in the Copromorphidae family. It is found on Mayotte and La Réunion.

This species has a wingspan of 18mm for the males and 20mm for the females.
