= Copromorpha lignisquama =

Scientific classification
- Domain: Eukaryota
- Kingdom: Animalia
- Phylum: Arthropoda
- Class: Insecta
- Order: Lepidoptera
- Family: Copromorphidae
- Genus: Copromorpha
- Species: C. lignisquama

Binomial name
- Copromorpha lignisquama Diakonoff, 1954

Species of moth

Copromorpha lignisquama is a moth in the Copromorphidae family. It is found in New Guinea.
