= Osidryas chlorotribes =

Scientific classification
- Kingdom: Animalia
- Phylum: Arthropoda
- Class: Insecta
- Order: Lepidoptera
- Family: Copromorphidae
- Genus: Osidryas
- Species: O. chlorotribes

Binomial name
- Osidryas chlorotribes Meyrick, 1939

Species of moth

Osidryas chlorotribes is a moth in the Copromorphidae family. It is found on Java.
