= Copromorpha orthidias =

Scientific classification
- Kingdom: Animalia
- Phylum: Arthropoda
- Class: Insecta
- Order: Lepidoptera
- Family: Copromorphidae
- Genus: Copromorpha
- Species: C. orthidias

Binomial name
- Copromorpha orthidias Meyrick, 1927

Species of moth

Copromorpha orthidias is a moth in the Copromorphidae family. It is found on Samoa.
