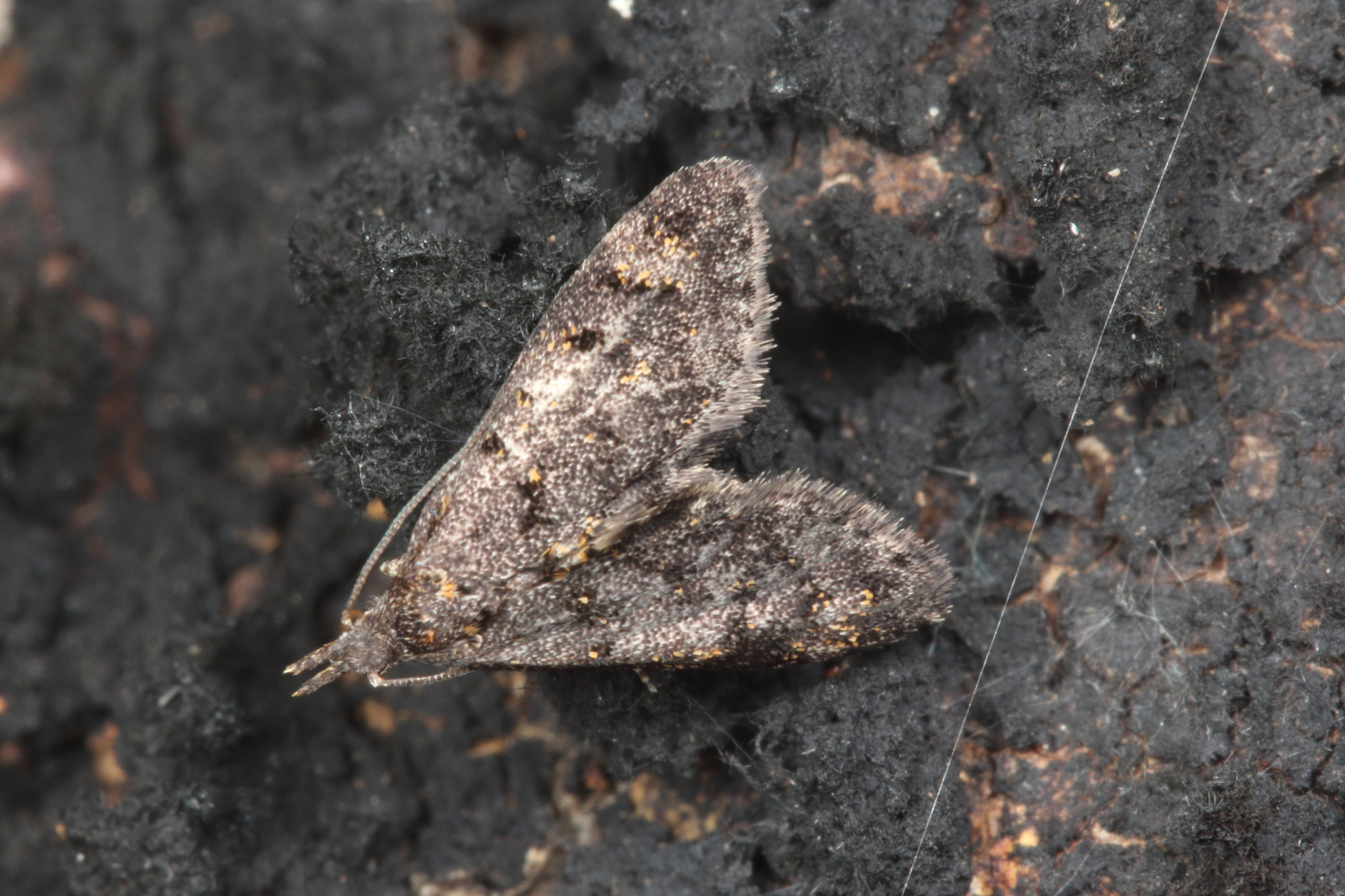

Scientific classification
- Kingdom: Animalia
- Phylum: Arthropoda
- Class: Insecta
- Order: Lepidoptera
- Family: Copromorphidae
- Genus: Isonomeutis
- Species: I. amauropa

Binomial name
- Isonomeutis amauropa Meyrick, 1888

= Isonomeutis amauropa =

Species of moth, endemic to New Zealand

Isonomeutis amauropa is a species of moth in the Copromorphidae family. It is endemic to New Zealand where it can be found on both the North and South Islands. I. amauropa inhabits native forest particularly forest dominated by Rimu and native beech trees. The larvae of this species consumes margarodid scale insects that live under the bark of these trees. When mature the larvae pupate in a cocoon made of silk and covered in twigs and frass. This cocoon is normally placed under the bark of the same tree the larvae inhabited. Adults of I. amauropa are on the wing from September to February.

== Taxonomy ==
This species was first described by Edward Meyrick in 1888 using a specimen collected at Mount Manaia in Whangārei in December. In 1928 Alfred Philpott published a paper giving descriptions of the structures of this species including the male genitalia. Also in 1928 George Hudson discussed and illustrated this species in his book The butterflies and moths of New Zealand. Hudson also illustrated this species in his 1939 publication A supplement to the butterflies and moths of New Zealand under the name Isonomeutis restincta. In 1988 J. S. Dugdale discussed this species in his catalogue of New Zealand Lepidoptera. The male holotype specimen is held at the Natural History Museum, London.

== Description ==
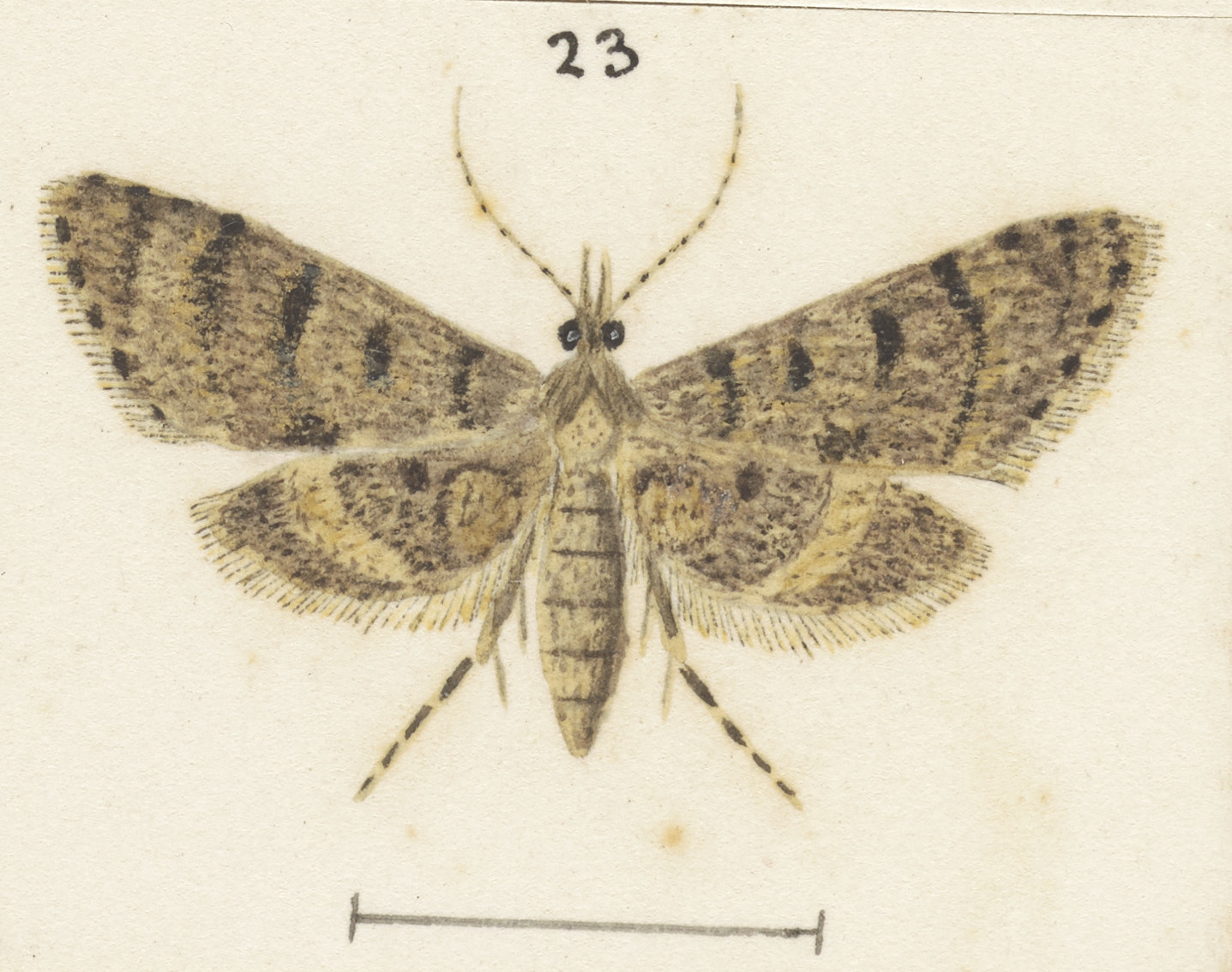
Female I. amauropa illustrated by George Hudson.

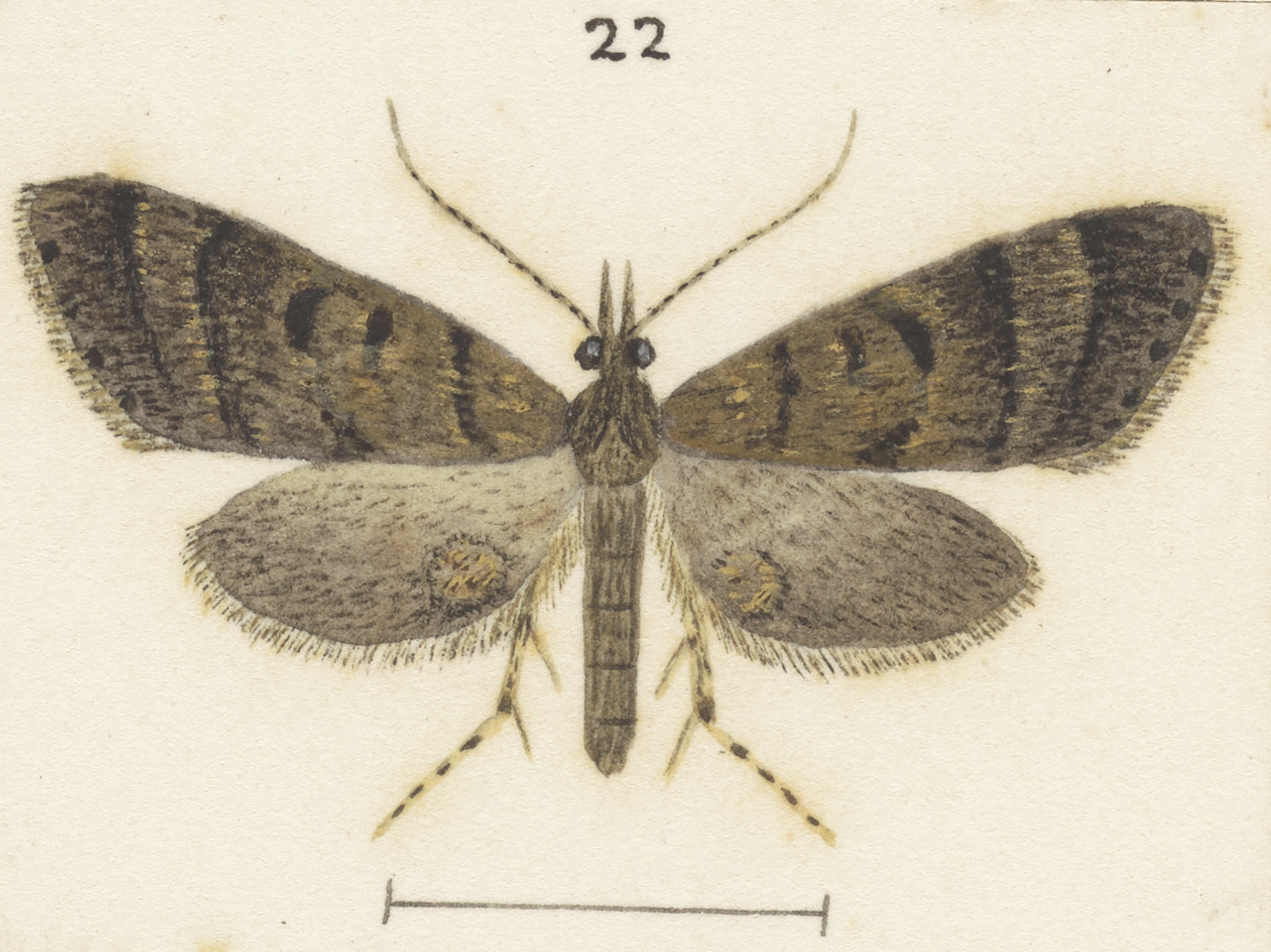
Male I. amauropa illustrated by George Hudson.

Meyrick originally described this species as follows:

Male.—12 mm. Head, antennae, thorax, and abdomen dark fuscous. Palpi dark fuscous, beneath white towards base, with a median longitudinal bright ferruginous streak. Legs dark fuscous, apex of joints ochreous-whitish. Forewings elongate, posteriorly considerably dilated, costa gently arched, apex rounded, hindmargin slightly rounded, rather strongly oblique; dark fuscous-grey; markings light ferruginous mixed with black, ill-defined; a small spot beneath costa near base, and another before middle; three transverse strigæ, angulated in middle, not reaching costa, first about 1/3, second and third before and beyond 2/3; a small mark beneath costa at 4/5, preceded by an obscure whitish suffusion; a hindmarginal series of small obscure black spots, separated by whitish scales: cilia dark grey, with a darker line, and a small whitish apical spot. Hindwings dark fuscous grey; an irregular sinuate black streak, mixed with light ferruginous, from centre of disc to anal angle; hindmarginal spots and cilia as in forewings.

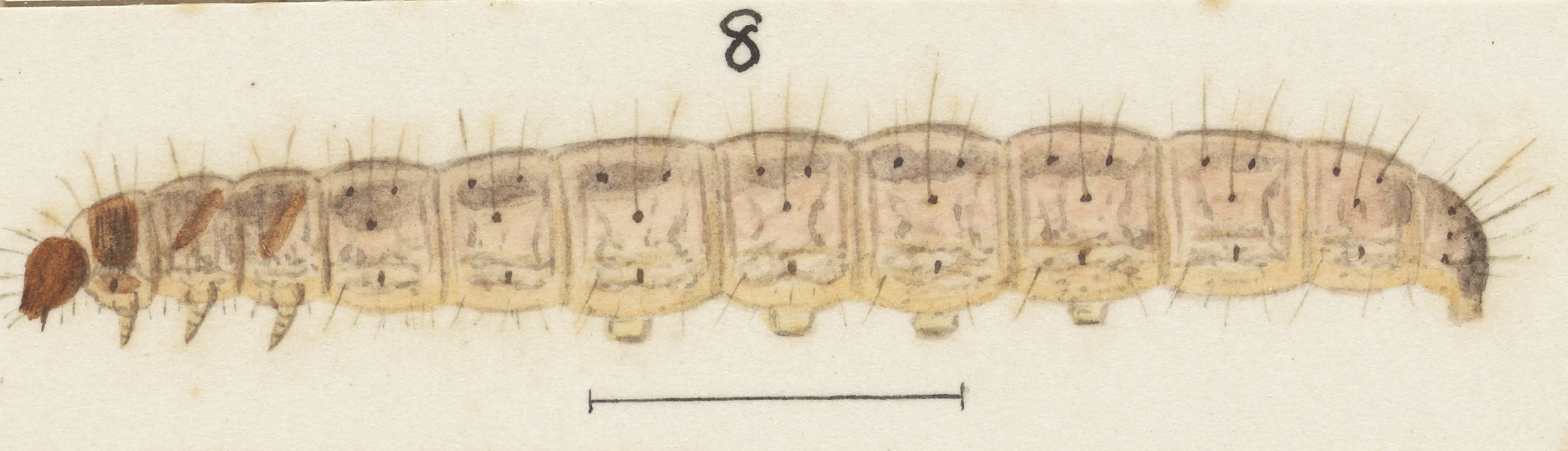
Illustration of I. amauropa larva by George Hudson.

Hudson described the larva of this species as follows:

When full-grown it is about #inch long. moderately st and rather flattened. The head is brown highly polished; the second segment has a large dorsal and two small shining brown lateral plates; segments 3 and 4 each have two narrow oblique horny plates; the rest of the body is soft, bright pinkish-brown above, much paler beneath; there are three conspicuous warts on each segment except the last and two obscure warts below the lateral ridge; the last segment is dark yellowish-brown with numerous warts. The whole larva is clothed with a few scattered black bristles, which are more numerous at each extremity.

This species is much darker in appearance than its close relative I. restincta.

== Distribution ==
This species is endemic to New Zealand and is found in the North Island and at the top of the South Island.

== Behaviour ==
Adults of this species are on the wing from September until February. This moth is a day flying moth and are attracted to light at night. Hudson states that the adults of this species often bask in the sun on top of leaves. Meyrick collected this species at rest on a tree trunk.

== Habitat ==
This species inhabits native New Zealand forest particularly forest dominated by rimu and native beech trees.

== Life cycle ==
Larvae live under the bark of trees. Pupation takes place in a cocoon constructed out of tough silk and covered with twigs and frass. The cocoon is normally placed in a crevice under the bark of a tree in which the larvae have been inhabiting.

== Host species ==
The larvae are predatory, feeding on margarodid scale insects including Ultracoelostoma assimile, under the bark of trees such as Dacrydium cupressinum and beech.
