= Ordrupia macroctenis =

Scientific classification
- Kingdom: Animalia
- Phylum: Arthropoda
- Class: Insecta
- Order: Lepidoptera
- Family: Copromorphidae
- Genus: Ordrupia
- Species: O. macroctenis

Binomial name
- Ordrupia macroctenis Meyrick, 1926

Species of moth

Ordrupia macroctenis is a moth in the family Copromorphidae. It was described by Edward Meyrick in 1926. It is found in Peru.

The wingspan is 34–37 mm. The forewings are violet fuscous, darker in females, lighter and ochreous tinged towards the dorsum anteriorly. There are cloudy dark fuscous dots in the disc at one-third and on the lower angle of the cell, and a more obscure mark on the upper angle. The hindwings are pale greyish.
