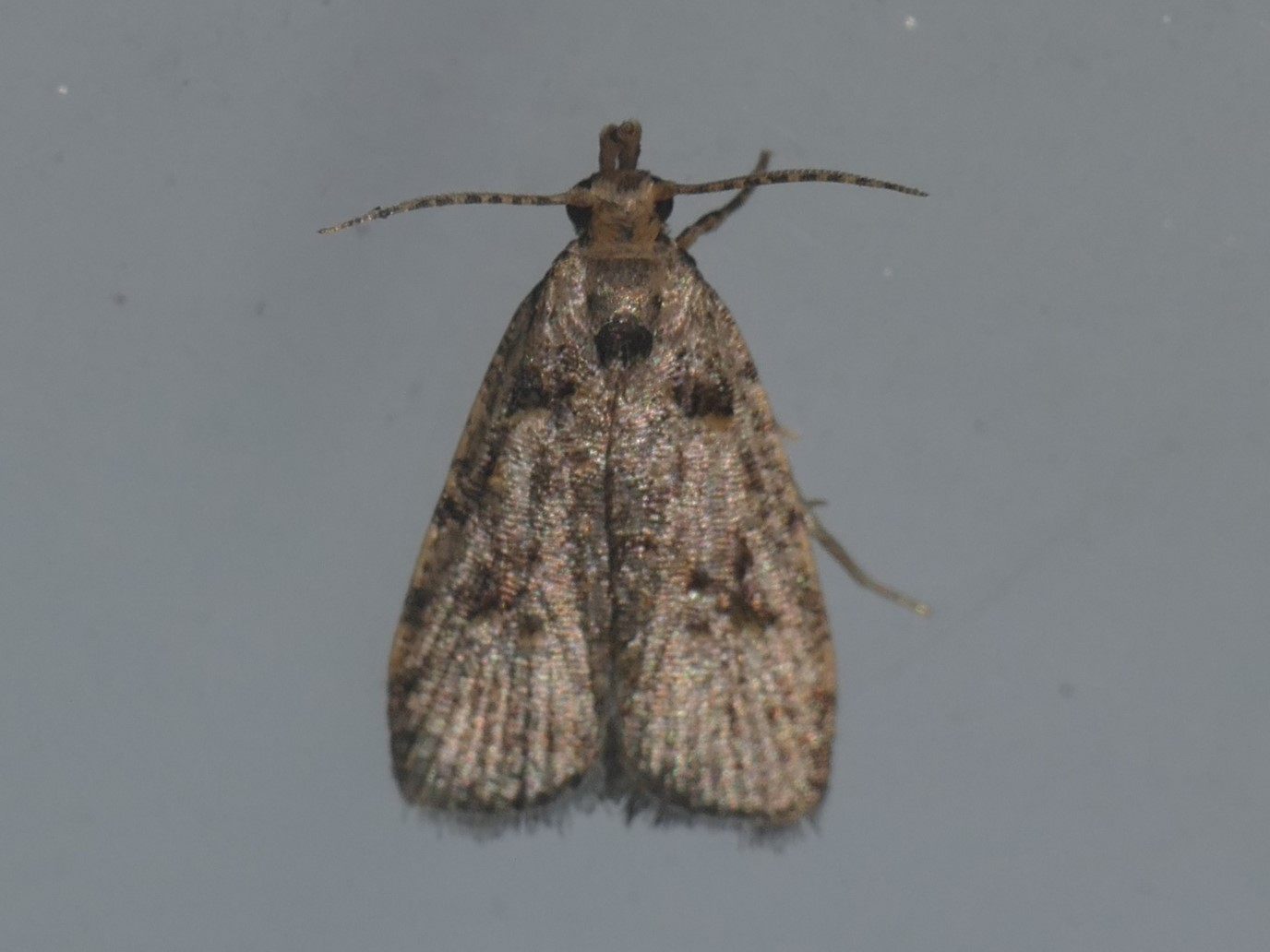

Scientific classification
- Kingdom: Animalia
- Phylum: Arthropoda
- Class: Insecta
- Order: Lepidoptera
- Family: Copromorphidae
- Genus: Copromorpha
- Species: C. kijimuna

Binomial name
- Copromorpha kijimuna Nasu, Saito & Komai, 2004

= Copromorpha kijimuna =

Moth in the Copromorphidae family

Copromorpha kijimuna is a species of moth in the family Copromorphidae. It is found in Japan (Ryukyu Islands).
