= Copromorpha efflorescens =

Scientific classification
- Kingdom: Animalia
- Phylum: Arthropoda
- Class: Insecta
- Order: Lepidoptera
- Family: Copromorphidae
- Genus: Copromorpha
- Species: C. efflorescens

Binomial name
- Copromorpha efflorescens Meyrick, 1906

Species of moth

Copromorpha efflorescens is a moth in the family Copromorphidae. It is found in Sri Lanka.
