= Rhynchoferella kuehnei =

Scientific classification
- Kingdom: Animalia
- Phylum: Arthropoda
- Clade: Pancrustacea
- Class: Insecta
- Order: Lepidoptera
- Family: Copromorphidae
- Genus: Rhynchoferella
- Species: R. kuehnei

Binomial name
- Rhynchoferella kuehnei Mey, 2007

Species of moth

Rhynchoferella kuehnei is a moth in the family Copromorphidae. It is found in Kenya.
