= Ordrupia friserella =

Scientific classification
- Domain: Eukaryota
- Kingdom: Animalia
- Phylum: Arthropoda
- Class: Insecta
- Order: Lepidoptera
- Family: Copromorphidae
- Genus: Ordrupia
- Species: O. friserella

Binomial name
- Ordrupia friserella Busck, 1911

Species of moth

Ordrupia friserella is a moth in the Copromorphidae family. It was described by August Busck in 1911. It is found in Panama.

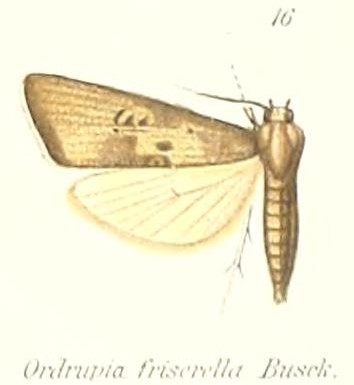
Ordrupia friserella
