= Schistocyttara =

Scientific classification
- Kingdom: Animalia
- Phylum: Arthropoda
- Class: Insecta
- Order: Lepidoptera
- Family: Copromorphidae
- Genus: Schistocyttara

Species
- See text

Genus of moths

Schistocyttara is a genus of moths of the family Copromorphidae. It was formerly in the family Yponomeutidae.

== Species ==
- Schistocyttara nebulosa - Turner, 1942
