= Copromorpha roepkei =

Scientific classification
- Domain: Eukaryota
- Kingdom: Animalia
- Phylum: Arthropoda
- Class: Insecta
- Order: Lepidoptera
- Family: Copromorphidae
- Genus: Copromorpha
- Species: C. roepkei

Binomial name
- Copromorpha roepkei Diakonoff, 1953

Species of moth

Copromorpha roepkei is a moth in the family Copromorphidae. It is found on Java.
