= Copromorpha dialithoma =

Scientific classification
- Domain: Eukaryota
- Kingdom: Animalia
- Phylum: Arthropoda
- Class: Insecta
- Order: Lepidoptera
- Family: Copromorphidae
- Genus: Copromorpha
- Species: C. dialithoma

Binomial name
- Copromorpha dialithoma Diakonoff, 1967

Species of moth

Copromorpha dialithoma is a moth in the Copromorphidae family. It is found in the Philippines (Luzon).
