= Copromorpha cryptochlora =

Scientific classification
- Kingdom: Animalia
- Phylum: Arthropoda
- Class: Insecta
- Order: Lepidoptera
- Family: Copromorphidae
- Genus: Copromorpha
- Species: C. cryptochlora

Binomial name
- Copromorpha cryptochlora Meyrick, 1930

Species of moth

Copromorpha cryptochlora is a moth in the Copromorphidae family. It is found on the Comoros and Seychelles.

This species has a wingspan of 14mm.

== Subspecies ==
- Copromorpha cryptochlora cryptochlora (Comoros)
- Copromorpha cryptochlora alixella Legrand, 1965 (Seychelles)
