= Copromorpha macrolepis =

Scientific classification
- Domain: Eukaryota
- Kingdom: Animalia
- Phylum: Arthropoda
- Class: Insecta
- Order: Lepidoptera
- Family: Copromorphidae
- Genus: Copromorpha
- Species: C. macrolepis

Binomial name
- Copromorpha macrolepis Diakonoff, 1959

Species of moth

Copromorpha macrolepis is a moth in the Copromorphidae family. It is found on Sulawesi.
