= Copromorpha metallistis =

Scientific classification
- Kingdom: Animalia
- Phylum: Arthropoda
- Class: Insecta
- Order: Lepidoptera
- Family: Copromorphidae
- Genus: Copromorpha
- Species: C. metallistis

Binomial name
- Copromorpha metallistis Meyrick, 1906

Species of moth

Copromorpha metallistis is a moth in the Copromorphidae family. It is found in Sri Lanka.
