= Lotisma trigonana =

Scientific classification
- Domain: Eukaryota
- Kingdom: Animalia
- Phylum: Arthropoda
- Class: Insecta
- Order: Lepidoptera
- Family: Copromorphidae
- Genus: Lotisma
- Species: L. trigonana

Binomial name
- Lotisma trigonana (Walsingham, 1879)

Synonyms
- Sciaphila trigonana Walsingham, 1879; Hemerophila kincaidiella Busck, 1904

Species of moth

Lotisma trigonana is a moth in the Copromorphidae family. It is found along the Pacific coast of North America, from Alaska to Costa Rica.

The wingspan is 14–22 mm.

The larvae feed on Gaultheria shallon, but have also been recorded feeding on cranberry.

== Subspecies ==
- Lotisma trigonana trigonana
- Lotisma trigonana durangoensis Heppner, 1986 (Mexico: Durango)
