= Copromorpha gypsota =

Scientific classification
- Kingdom: Animalia
- Phylum: Arthropoda
- Class: Insecta
- Order: Lepidoptera
- Family: Copromorphidae
- Genus: Copromorpha
- Species: C. gypsota

Binomial name
- Copromorpha gypsota Meyrick, 1886

Species of moth

Copromorpha gypsota is a moth in the Copromorphidae family. It is found on Fiji and has a wingspan of 26-30mm.
