= Copromorpha fossilis =

Scientific classification
- Domain: Eukaryota
- Kingdom: Animalia
- Phylum: Arthropoda
- Class: Insecta
- Order: Lepidoptera
- Family: Copromorphidae
- Genus: Copromorpha
- Species: C. fossilis

Binomial name
- Copromorpha fossilis Jarzembowski, 1980

Extinct species of moth

Copromorpha fossilis is an extinct species of moth in the Copromorphidae family. It was described from the Bembridge Marls of the Isle of Wight, a rock formation of Oligocene age, about 35 million years old.
