= Copromorpha nesographa =

Scientific classification
- Kingdom: Animalia
- Phylum: Arthropoda
- Class: Insecta
- Order: Lepidoptera
- Family: Copromorphidae
- Genus: Copromorpha
- Species: C. nesographa

Binomial name
- Copromorpha nesographa Meyrick, 1926

Species of moth

Copromorpha nesographa is a moth in the Copromorphidae family. It is found on New Ireland.

The wingspan is 22–24 mm. The forewings are pale ochreous, in the disc and posteriorly more or less suffused light grey and speckled silvery-whitish. There are several variable irregular blackish spots and irroration along the costa and a blackish streak along the dorsum about one-fourth, as well as a small blackish spot in the disc at one-fourth. An irregular-trapezoidal blackish blotch is found in the middle of the disc, widest above and narrowed downwards, the upper edge emarginate. There are some scattered transverse blackish strigulae in the dorsal half and there is an irregular subovate blackish blotch towards the apex, confluent with the middle one of three small posterior costal spots. Four cloudy dark fuscous dots are connected by fuscous suffusion in a series before the lower part of the termen. The hindwings are grey.
