= Copromorpha thrombota =

Scientific classification
- Kingdom: Animalia
- Phylum: Arthropoda
- Class: Insecta
- Order: Lepidoptera
- Family: Copromorphidae
- Genus: Copromorpha
- Species: C. thrombota

Binomial name
- Copromorpha thrombota Meyrick, 1916

Species of moth

Copromorpha thrombota is a moth in the Copromorphidae family. It is found on the Solomon Islands.
