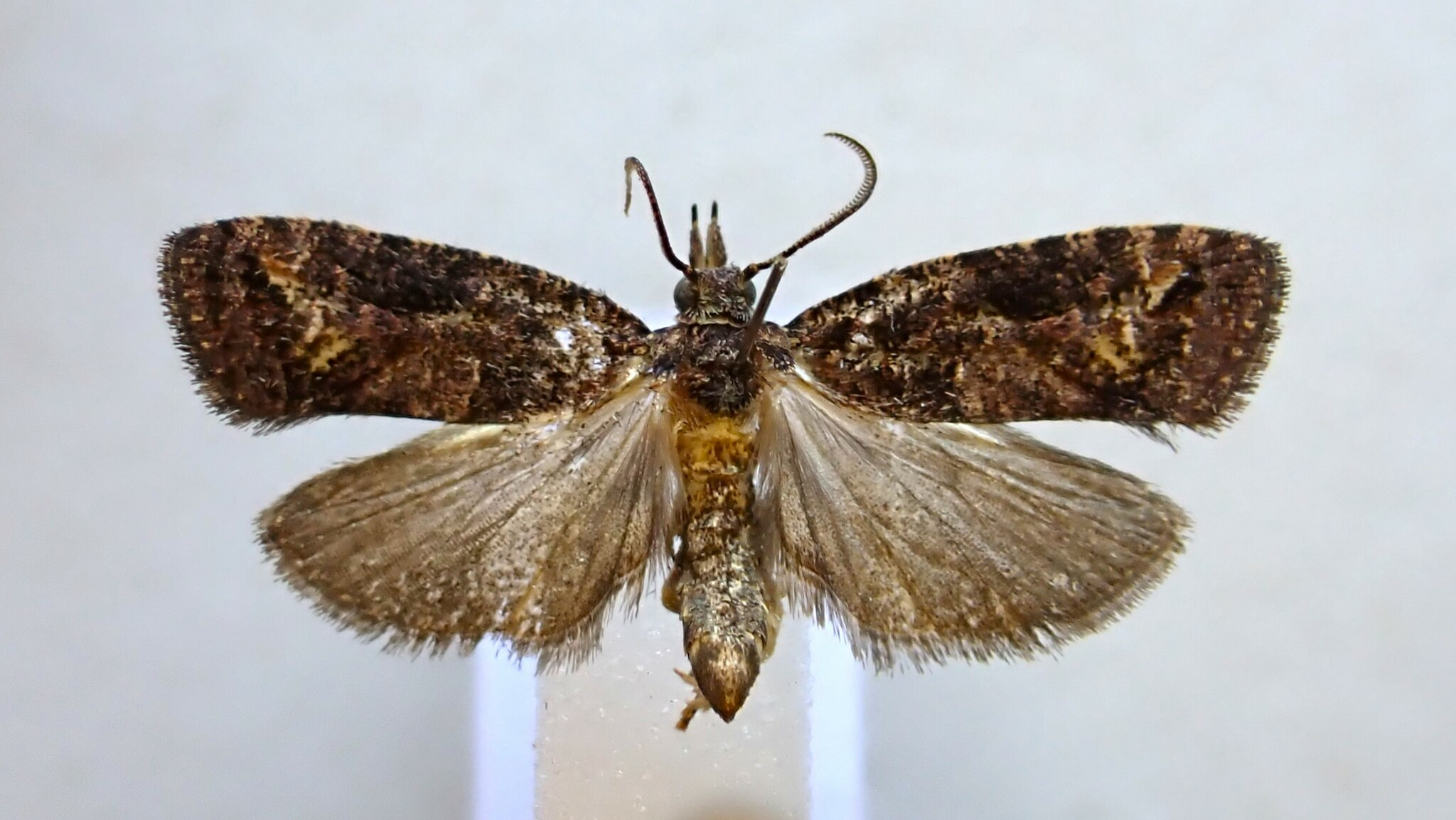

Scientific classification
- Kingdom: Animalia
- Phylum: Arthropoda
- Class: Insecta
- Order: Lepidoptera
- Family: Copromorphidae
- Genus: Phycomorpha
- Species: P. metachrysa

Binomial name
- Phycomorpha metachrysa Meyrick, 1914

= Phycomorpha metachrysa =

Species of moth

Phycomorpha metachrysa, the milktree fruit moth, is a species of moth in the Copromorphidae family. It is endemic to New Zealand and has been found in the North and South Islands. The larvae feed on the fruit of species in the genus Streblus including Streblus heterophyllus. This adults of this species is on the wing from October to April.

== Taxonomy ==
This species was first described by Edward Meyrick in 1914 using specimens collected by George Howes in Dunedin in November and February. In 1928 George Hudson discussed and illustrated this species in his book The butterflies and moths of New Zealand. The lectotype specimen, collected in Dunedin, is in the collection of the Natural History Museum, London.

== Description ==
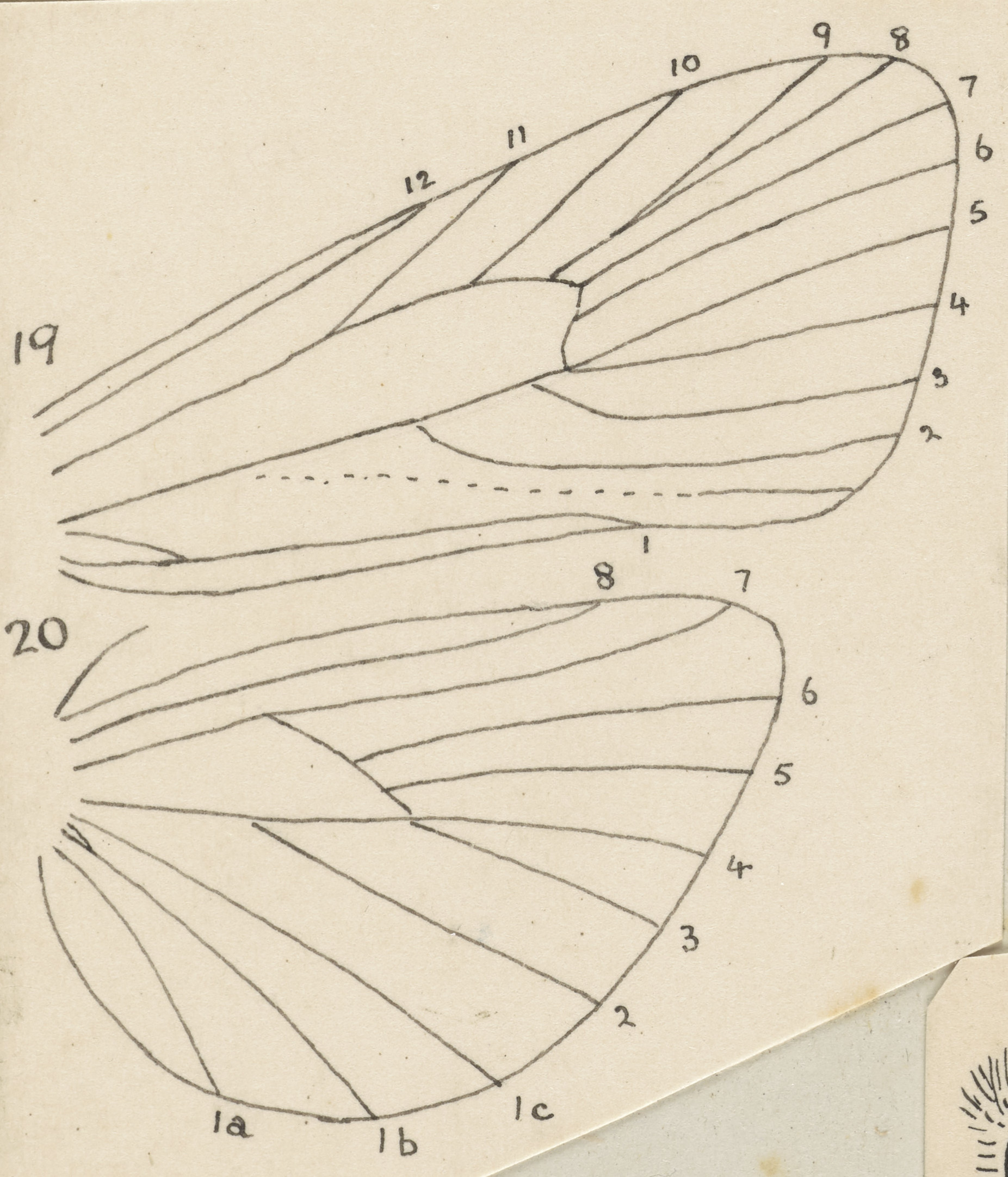
Neuration of fore and hind wing of P. metachrysa.

Meyrick described this species as follows:

♂♀. 19-20 mm. Head pale greenish-ochreous, forehead mixed with purplish and spotted with dark fuscous. Palpi purplish-fuscous irrorated with dark fuscous, edges of second joint sprinkled with whitish, terminal joint half second, blackish, base and apex whitish. Thorax pale ochreous mixed with purplish and spotted with dark fuscous, crest olive-green. Fore-wings elongate, rather dilated posteriorly, costa slightly arched, apex rounded-obtuse, termen rounded, somewhat oblique; dull purple sprinkled with blackish, tips of scales golden-metallic; costa and dorsum strigulated and spotted with blackish; basal and discal areas irregularly marked with dull greenish and black; in one specimen a large trapezoidal whitish-ochreous blotch extending on dorsum from 1/4 to tornus and reaching more than half across wing, narrowed upwards; cilia bronzy-grey barred with blackish. Hindwings and cilia grey.

The wingspan is 19–20 mm. Adults are dark green with raised scale-tufts on the forewings. Hudson states that this species is considerably variable with some specimens having forewings that are a dull olive green colour. Other specimens have a cream white patch on the dorsum which extends about halfway across the forewing. However, despite this variability this species is able to be recognised by its unusual antennae and the scale tufts on its forewings.

== Distribution ==
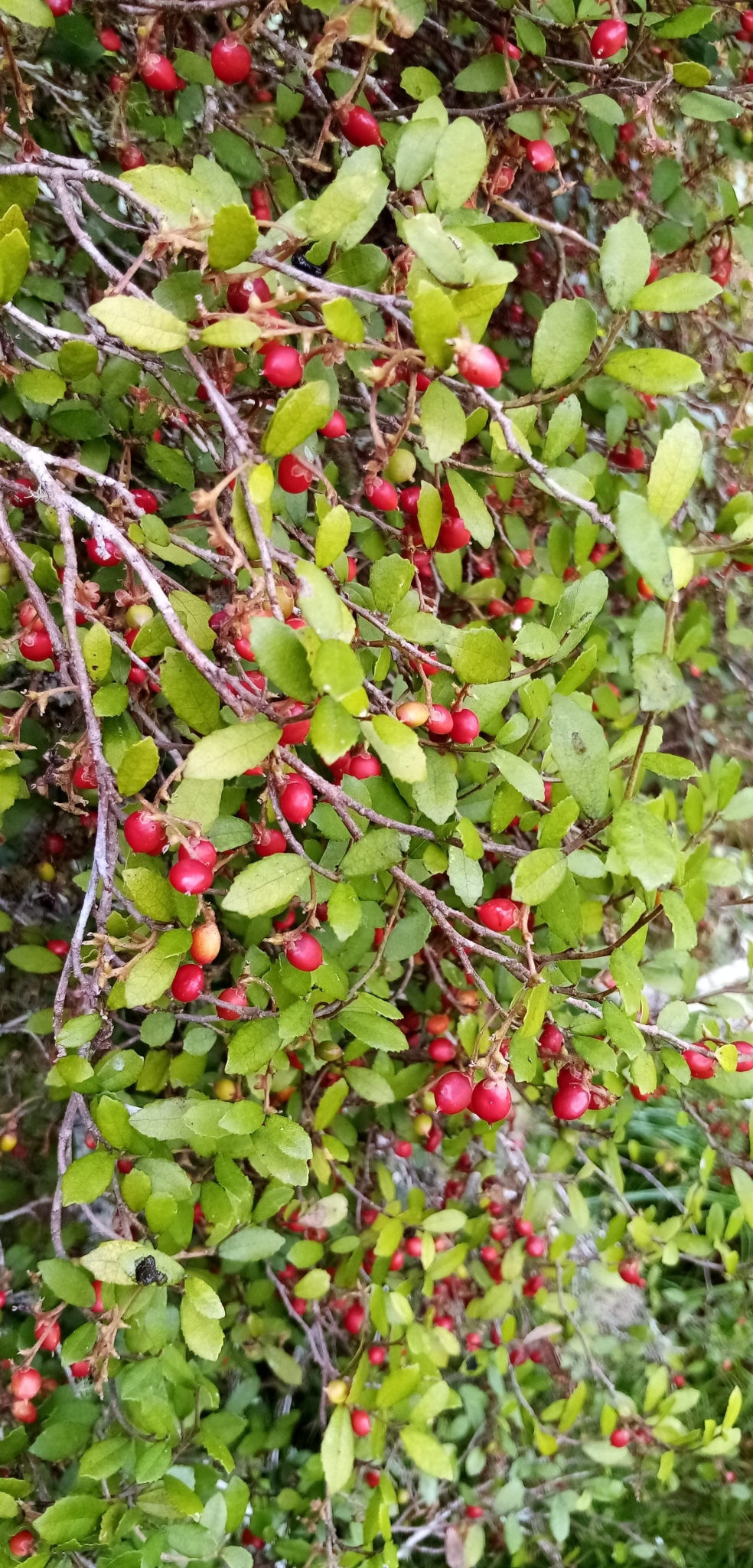
Fruit of the Streblus heterophyllus, larval food for P. metachrysa.

This species is endemic to New Zealand and is found in both the North and South Islands. It has been observed in its type locality of Dunedin, at the head of Lake Wakatipu and also in the Gollan Valley of Wellington and Kaeo in Northland. This species has also been found in a site of ecological significance, at Decanter Bay in Canterbury, as set out in the Christchurch District Plan.

== Behaviour ==
The adults of this species is on the wing from October until April.

== Host species ==
The larvae feed on the fruit of Streblus species including Streblus heterophyllus.
