= Copromorpha pyrrhoscia =

Scientific classification
- Kingdom: Animalia
- Phylum: Arthropoda
- Class: Insecta
- Order: Lepidoptera
- Family: Copromorphidae
- Genus: Copromorpha
- Species: C. pyrrhoscia

Binomial name
- Copromorpha pyrrhoscia Meyrick, 1935

Species of moth

Copromorpha pyrrhoscia is a moth in the Copromorphidae family. It is found on Fiji.
