= Copromorpha aeruginea =

Scientific classification
- Kingdom: Animalia
- Phylum: Arthropoda
- Class: Insecta
- Order: Lepidoptera
- Family: Copromorphidae
- Genus: Copromorpha
- Species: C. aeruginea

Binomial name
- Copromorpha aeruginea Meyrick, 1917

Species of moth

Copromorpha aeruginea is a moth in the family Copromorphidae. It was described by Edward Meyrick in 1917.

It is found on the Comoros and Mauritius, as well as in South Africa. and has a wingspan of 17 mm.
