= Phycomorpha escharitis =

Scientific classification
- Kingdom: Animalia
- Phylum: Arthropoda
- Class: Insecta
- Order: Lepidoptera
- Family: Copromorphidae
- Genus: Phycomorpha
- Species: P. escharitis

Binomial name
- Phycomorpha escharitis Meyrick, 1916

Species of moth

Phycomorpha escharitis is a moth in the family Copromorphidae. It was described by Edward Meyrick in 1916. It is found in Colombia.
