= Ordrupia fanniella =

Scientific classification
- Domain: Eukaryota
- Kingdom: Animalia
- Phylum: Arthropoda
- Class: Insecta
- Order: Lepidoptera
- Family: Copromorphidae
- Genus: Ordrupia
- Species: O. fanniella

Binomial name
- Ordrupia fanniella Busck, 1912

Species of moth

Ordrupia fanniella is a moth in the family Copromorphidae. It was described by August Busck in 1912. It is found in Panama.
