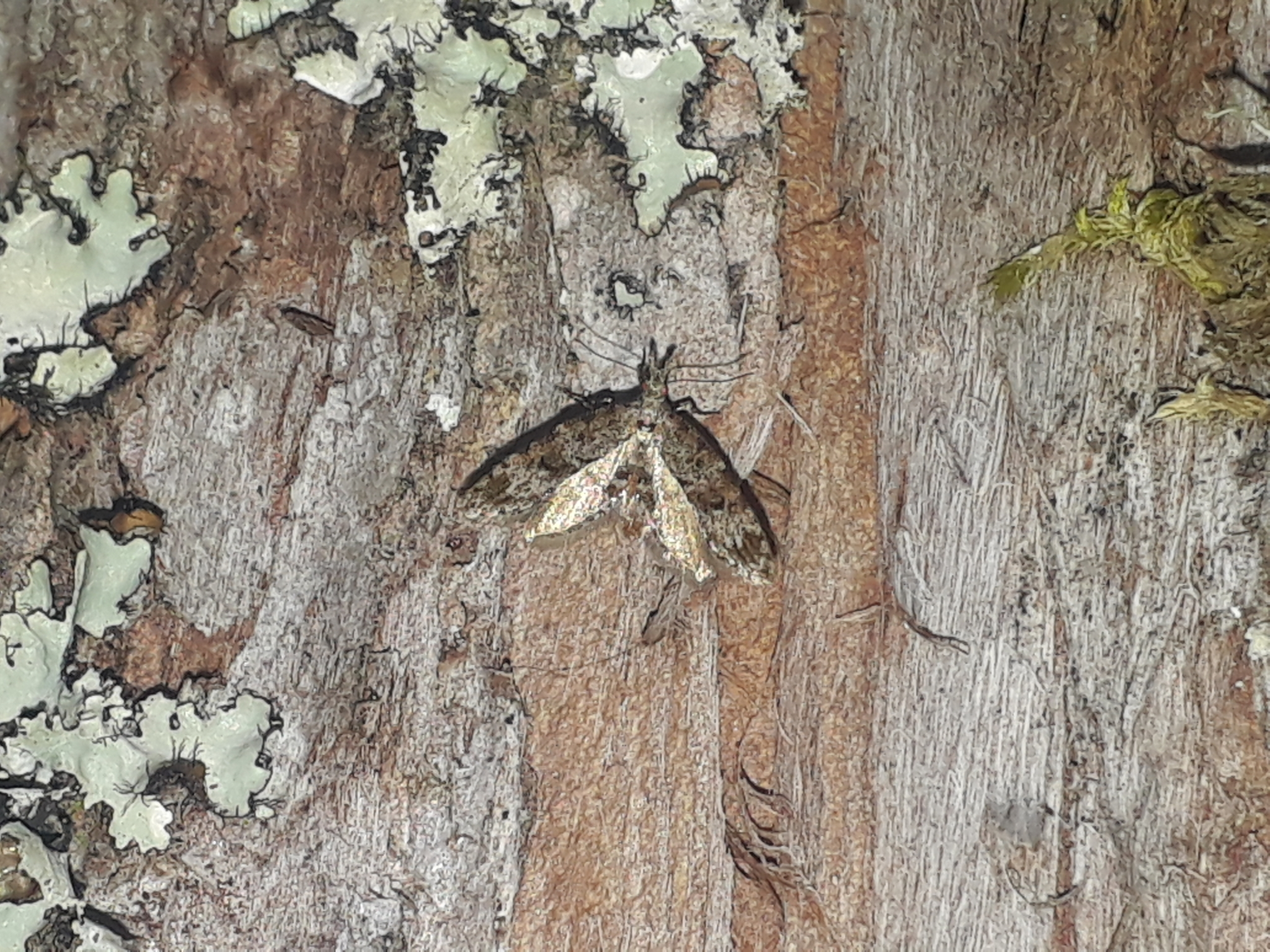
- Observed in Kaeo

Conservation status
- Naturally Uncommon (NZ TCS)

Scientific classification
- Kingdom: Animalia
- Phylum: Arthropoda
- Class: Insecta
- Order: Lepidoptera
- Family: Copromorphidae
- Genus: Isonomeutis
- Species: I. restincta

Binomial name
- Isonomeutis restincta Meyrick, 1923

= Isonomeutis restincta =

Species of moth, endemic to New Zealand

Isonomeutis restincta, the marbled snouter, is a species of moth in the family Copromorphidae. It is endemic to New Zealand where it is likely found in the northern parts of the North Island. Not much is known of the life history of this species but it has been hypothesised that it is a scale insect predator. The adults of this species are on the wing from November to January. This species has been classified as "At Risk, Naturally Uncommon" by the Department of Conservation.

== Taxonomy ==
This species was first described by Edward Meyrick in 1923 using a specimen collected by George Vernon Hudson at Kaeo, north of Auckland. Hudson discussed and illustrated this species in his 1928 publication The Butterflies and Moths of New Zealand. The male holotype specimen, collected at Kaeo in Northland, is held at the Natural History Museum, London.

== Description ==
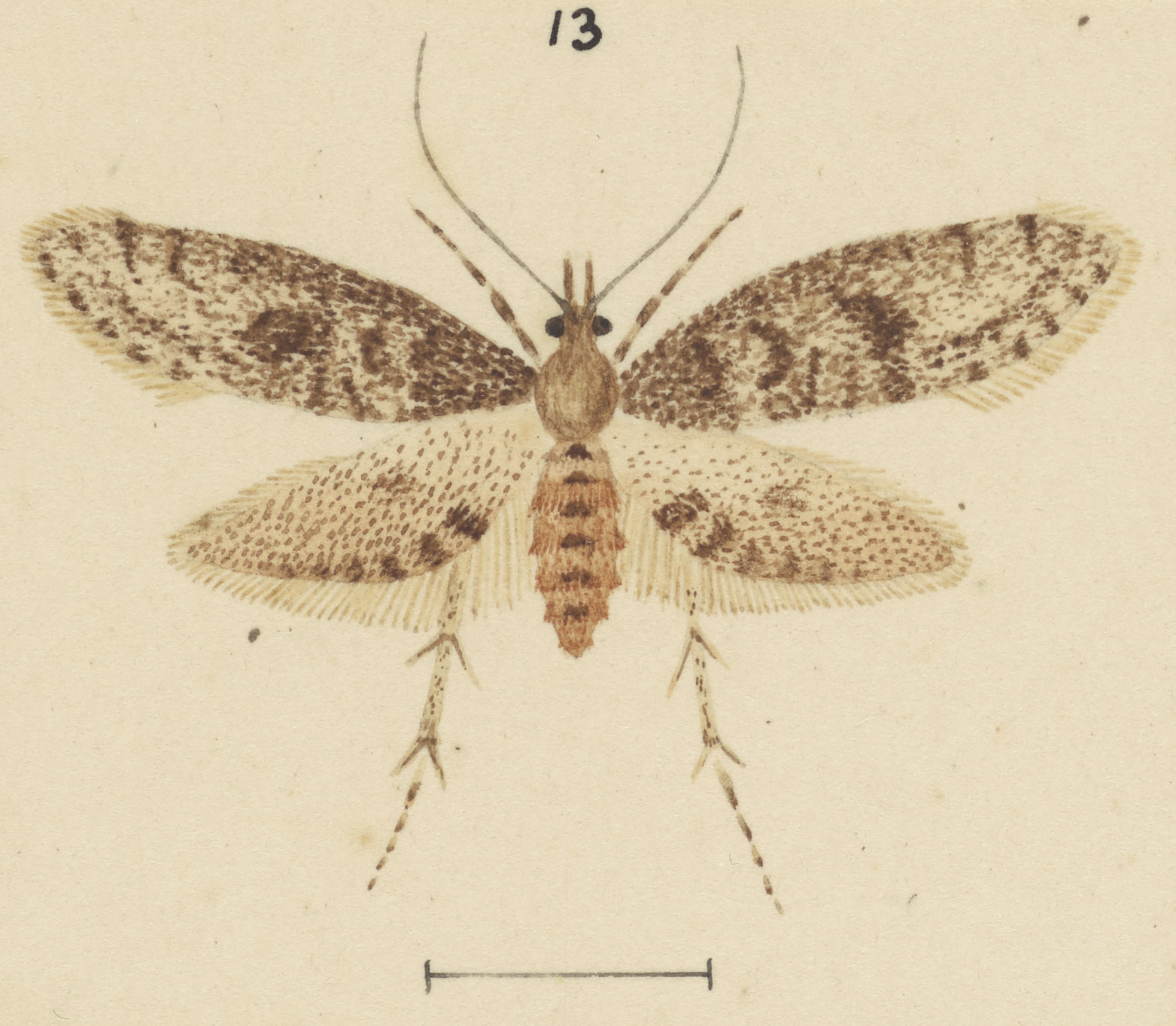
Illustration of female I. restincta by George Hudson.

Meyrick described the species as follows:

♀︎. 12 mm. Head brownish, sides of crown sprinkled with whitish. Palpi brownish sprinkled with dark fuscous, towards base beneath and on upper edge sprinkled with whitish. Thorax brownish. Abdomen rather dark fuscous, mixed laterally with white and on edges of two basal segments. Forewings elongate, not dilated posteriorly, costa gently arched, apex obtuse, termen very obliquely rounded; white-brownish, irregularly and coarsely sprinkled with dark fuscous; markings formed by suffused dark-fuscous irroration; a streak along basal 2/5 of costa; a moderate median fascia angulated in middle, posterior edge of angulation with a stronger dark-fuscous mark: cilia pale-brownish, basal third sprinkled with whitish and marked with well-defined spots of dark-fuscous irroration. Hindwings 6 absent; pale-brownish, speckled with fuscous; a transverse whitish spot on tornus, preceded and followed by dark-fuscous suffusion: cilia pale-brownish, with darker subbasal line, round tornus mixed at base with whitish and dark fuscous.

== Distribution ==
Isonomeutis restincta is endemic to New Zealand. It occurs in the Northland, Auckland and Taupō districts and in the Pureora Forest. In 1939 Hudson also stated in occurred in Wiltons bush in Wellington however, given he mistakenly illustrated its close relative I. amauropa as I. restincta in that publication this statement is in doubt.

== Biology and life history ==
Very little of the life history of this species is known. The adults have been recorded as being on the wing in November, December and January.

== Habitat and host species ==
The host species of the larvae of I. restincta is unknown. However it has been hypothesised that it is a scale insect predator like I. amauropa.

== Conservation status ==
This species has been classified as having the "At Risk, Naturally Uncommon" conservation status, with the qualifier of being range restricted, under the New Zealand Threat Classification System.
