= Phycomorpha bryophylla =

Scientific classification
- Kingdom: Animalia
- Phylum: Arthropoda
- Class: Insecta
- Order: Lepidoptera
- Family: Copromorphidae
- Genus: Phycomorpha
- Species: P. bryophylla

Binomial name
- Phycomorpha bryophylla Meyrick, 1927

Species of moth

Phycomorpha bryophylla is a moth in the family Copromorphidae. It was described by Edward Meyrick in 1927. It is found on Samoa.
