= Ordrupia fabricata =

Scientific classification
- Kingdom: Animalia
- Phylum: Arthropoda
- Class: Insecta
- Order: Lepidoptera
- Family: Copromorphidae
- Genus: Ordrupia
- Species: O. fabricata

Binomial name
- Ordrupia fabricata Meyrick, 1915

Species of moth

Ordrupia fabricata is a moth in the family Copromorphidae. It was described by Edward Meyrick in 1915. It is found in Guyana and Trinidad.

The wingspan is 26–30 mm. The forewings are suffused with fuscous except for a patch towards the basal area of the dorsum, which is mostly suffused with ochreous. The hindwings of the females are pale greyish, while those of the males are whitish.
