= Ordrupia dasyleuca =

Scientific classification
- Kingdom: Animalia
- Phylum: Arthropoda
- Class: Insecta
- Order: Lepidoptera
- Family: Copromorphidae
- Genus: Ordrupia
- Species: O. dasyleuca

Binomial name
- Ordrupia dasyleuca Meyrick, 1926

Species of moth

Ordrupia dasyleuca is a moth in the family Copromorphidae. It was described by Edward Meyrick in 1926. It is found in Peru.

The wingspan is about 34 mm. The forewings are lilac grey, with violet-white reflections, the basal two-fifths is suffused with pale ochreous except along the costa. There is a dark fuscous dot in the disc at one-third, another on the lower angle of the cell, and an indistinct oblique mark on the upper angle. The hindwings are grey whitish.
