= Copromorpha tetrarcha =

Scientific classification
- Kingdom: Animalia
- Phylum: Arthropoda
- Class: Insecta
- Order: Lepidoptera
- Family: Copromorphidae
- Genus: Copromorpha
- Species: C. tetrarcha

Binomial name
- Copromorpha tetrarcha Meyrick, 1916

Species of moth

Copromorpha tetrarcha is a moth in the Copromorphidae family. It is found on the Solomon Islands.
