= Copromorpha narcodes =

Scientific classification
- Kingdom: Animalia
- Phylum: Arthropoda
- Class: Insecta
- Order: Lepidoptera
- Family: Copromorphidae
- Genus: Copromorpha
- Species: C. narcodes

Binomial name
- Copromorpha narcodes Meyrick, 1916

Species of moth

Copromorpha narcodes is a moth in the Copromorphidae family. It is found in New Guinea.
