= Lotisma vulcanica =

Scientific classification
- Kingdom: Animalia
- Phylum: Arthropoda
- Class: Insecta
- Order: Lepidoptera
- Family: Copromorphidae
- Genus: Lotisma
- Species: L. vulcanica

Binomial name
- Lotisma vulcanica Meyrick, 1932

Species of moth

Lotisma vulcanica is a moth in the Copromorphidae family. It is found in Costa Rica.
