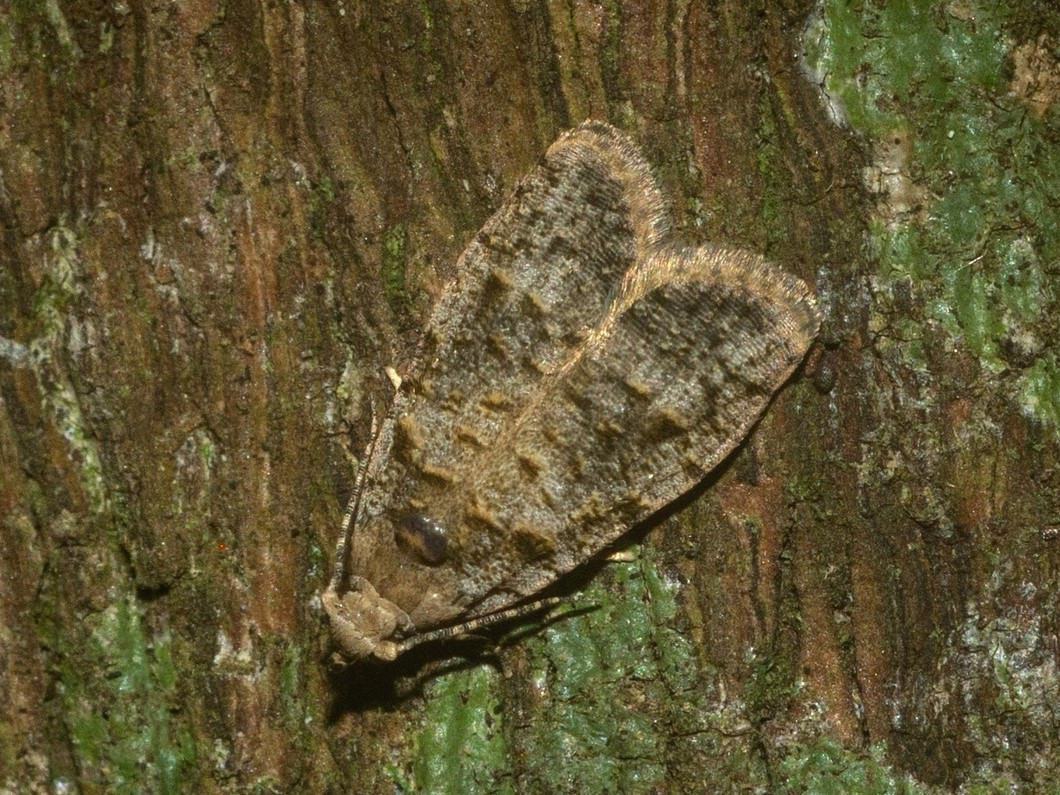

Scientific classification
- Domain: Eukaryota
- Kingdom: Animalia
- Phylum: Arthropoda
- Class: Insecta
- Order: Lepidoptera
- Family: Copromorphidae
- Genus: Copromorpha
- Species: C. phaeosticta

Binomial name
- Copromorpha phaeosticta (Turner, 1916)

Synonyms
- Trychnostola phaeosticta Turner, 1916

= Copromorpha phaeosticta =

Species of moth

Copromorpha phaeosticta is a species of moth in the family Copromorphidae. It is found in Australia, where it has been recorded from Queensland.

== Description ==
The wingspan is about 15 mm. The forewings are grey-whitish, strigulated with fuscous. There are a number of fuscous dots on the costa and there is a transverse ridge of elevated scales from the dorsum nearly to the costa. The hindwings are pale-grey.
