= Rhynchoferella =

Scientific classification
- Domain: Eukaryota
- Kingdom: Animalia
- Phylum: Arthropoda
- Class: Insecta
- Order: Lepidoptera
- Family: Copromorphidae
- Genus: Rhynchoferella; Strand, 1915

Synonyms
- Sisyroxena Meyrick, 1916

Genus of moths

Rhynchoferella is a genus of moths of the Copromorphidae family.

== Species ==
- Rhynchoferella hoppei Mey, 2007
- Rhynchoferella kuehnei Mey, 2007
- Rhynchoferella simplex Strand, 1915
- Rhynchoferella syncentra (Meyrick, 1916)
