= Copromorpha lichenitis =

Scientific classification
- Domain: Eukaryota
- Kingdom: Animalia
- Phylum: Arthropoda
- Class: Insecta
- Order: Lepidoptera
- Family: Copromorphidae
- Genus: Copromorpha
- Species: C. lichenitis

Binomial name
- Copromorpha lichenitis (Turner, 1916)

Synonyms
- Trychnostola lichenitis Turner, 1916

Species of moth

Copromorpha lichenitis is a species of moth in the family Copromorphidae. It is found in Australia, where it has been recorded from Queensland.

The wingspan is about 28 mm. The forewings are greenish, the costa and central part of disc suffused with whitish. The hindwings are pale-fuscous.
