= Phricanthes eutrachys =

Scientific classification
- Domain: Eukaryota
- Kingdom: Animalia
- Phylum: Arthropoda
- Class: Insecta
- Order: Lepidoptera
- Family: Tortricidae
- Genus: Phricanthes
- Species: P. eutrachys

Binomial name
- Phricanthes eutrachys (Diakonoff, 1948)

Synonyms
- Protypanthes eutrachys Diakonoff, 1948

Species of moth

Phricanthes eutrachys is a species of moth of the family Tortricidae. It is found on Sumatra, Indonesia.
