= Phricanthes hybristis =

Scientific classification
- Kingdom: Animalia
- Phylum: Arthropoda
- Class: Insecta
- Order: Lepidoptera
- Family: Tortricidae
- Genus: Phricanthes
- Species: P. hybristis

Binomial name
- Phricanthes hybristis (Meyrick, 1933)

Synonyms
- Protypanthes hybristis Meyrick, 1933

Species of moth

Phricanthes hybristis is a species of moth of the family Tortricidae. It is found on Java in Indonesia.
