= Phricanthes asperana =

Scientific classification
- Kingdom: Animalia
- Phylum: Arthropoda
- Class: Insecta
- Order: Lepidoptera
- Family: Tortricidae
- Genus: Phricanthes
- Species: P. asperana

Binomial name
- Phricanthes asperana Meyrick, 1881

Synonyms
- Polylopha elaphris Lower, 1908

Species of moth

Phricanthes asperana is a species of moth of the family Tortricidae. It is found in Australia from northern Queensland to southern New South Wales. The habitat consists of the margins of rainforests and wet eucalypt forests.

The larvae feed on Hibbertia scandens. They fold the leaves of their host plant.
