= Endothamna =

Scientific classification
- Kingdom: Animalia
- Phylum: Arthropoda
- Clade: Pancrustacea
- Class: Insecta
- Order: Lepidoptera
- Family: Copromorphidae
- Genus: Endothamna; Meyrick, 1922
- Species: E. marmarocyma

Binomial name
- Endothamna marmarocyma Meyrick, 1922

Genus of moths

Endothamna marmarocyma is a moth in the Copromorphidae family, and the only species in the genus Endothamna. It is found in Chile.
