= Neophylarcha =

Scientific classification
- Kingdom: Animalia
- Phylum: Arthropoda
- Class: Insecta
- Order: Lepidoptera
- Family: Copromorphidae
- Genus: Neophylarcha; Meyrick, 1926
- Species: N. helicosema

Binomial name
- Neophylarcha helicosema Meyrick, 1926

Species of moth

Neophylarcha helicosema is a moth in the family Copromorphidae, and the only species in the genus Neophylarcha. It is found in Guyana and French Guiana.

The wingspan is 15–17 mm. The forewings are whitish-ochreous, posteriorly tinged brownish-ochreous with some fuscous speckling and with short blackish-grey marks from the costa and dorsum at the base. There is an oblique blackish-grey shade from the costa at one-fifth reaching half across the wing, and a white spot emitting a short zigzag streak margined on each side by blackish-grey from costa at two-fifths, the space between these and on an oblique area beyond them suffused brownish-ochreous, from beneath the apex of spot a rather oblique line of blackish-grey irroration runs to the dorsum and there is a curved series of black dots or sublinear marks edged anteriorly with white scales running from the costa before three-fourths near the margins to the termen above the tornus. The hindwings of the males are whitish-grey-ochreous, while those of the females are grey.
