= Scolioplecta araea =

Scientific classification
- Kingdom: Animalia
- Phylum: Arthropoda
- Class: Insecta
- Order: Lepidoptera
- Family: Tortricidae
- Genus: Scolioplecta
- Species: S. araea

Binomial name
- Scolioplecta araea Turner, 1916

Synonyms
- Eucosma prosphiles Turner, 1946

Species of moth

Scolioplecta araea is a species of moth of the family Tortricidae. It is found in Australia in Queensland and the Northern Territory.

The wingspan is about 10 mm. The forewings are whitish, with some fine fuscous strigulae (fine streaks). The hindwings are pale grey.
