= Aegidomorpha =

Scientific classification
- Kingdom: Animalia
- Phylum: Arthropoda
- Class: Insecta
- Order: Lepidoptera
- Family: Copromorphidae
- Genus: Aegidomorpha; Meyrick, 1932
- Species: A. psammodina

Binomial name
- Aegidomorpha psammodina Meyrick, 1932

Species of moth

Aegidomorpha psammodina is a moth in the family Copromorphidae, and the only species in the genus Aegidomorpha. It is found in China.
