= Scolioplecta exochus =

Scientific classification
- Kingdom: Animalia
- Phylum: Arthropoda
- Class: Insecta
- Order: Lepidoptera
- Family: Tortricidae
- Genus: Scolioplecta
- Species: S. exochus

Binomial name
- Scolioplecta exochus Common, 1965

Species of moth

Scolioplecta exochus is a species of moth of the family Tortricidae. It is found in New South Wales, Australia.
