= Phricanthes peistica =

Scientific classification
- Domain: Eukaryota
- Kingdom: Animalia
- Phylum: Arthropoda
- Class: Insecta
- Order: Lepidoptera
- Family: Tortricidae
- Genus: Phricanthes
- Species: P. peistica

Binomial name
- Phricanthes peistica Common, 1965

Species of moth

Phricanthes peistica is a species of moth of the family Tortricidae. It is found in Queensland, Australia.
