= Rhynchoferella simplex =

Scientific classification
- Domain: Eukaryota
- Kingdom: Animalia
- Phylum: Arthropoda
- Class: Insecta
- Order: Lepidoptera
- Family: Copromorphidae
- Genus: Rhynchoferella
- Species: R. simplex

Binomial name
- Rhynchoferella simplex Strand, 1915

Species of moth

Rhynchoferella simplex is a moth in the Copromorphidae family. It is found in Cameroon and Ghana.
