= Phricanthes flexilineana =

Scientific classification
- Kingdom: Animalia
- Phylum: Arthropoda
- Class: Insecta
- Order: Lepidoptera
- Family: Tortricidae
- Genus: Phricanthes
- Species: P. flexilineana

Binomial name
- Phricanthes flexilineana (Walker, 1863)

Synonyms
- Sciaphila flexilineana Walker, 1863; Phricanthes macroura Lower, 1908; Australacleris memorabilis Diakonoff, 1970

Species of moth

Phricanthes flexilineana is a species of moth of the family Tortricidae first described by Francis Walker in 1863. The species was described from Sri Lanka, northern Queensland in Australia and the Seychelles, but has a much wider range, which includes Madagascar, India, Indonesia, Myanmar, New Guinea, the Philippines and Taiwan. It is also widely distributed in the tropical parts of North and South America.

The larvae have been recorded feeding on Tetracera volubilis, Dillenia indica and Davilla nitia.
