= Myrmecia =

Myrmecia can refer to:

- Myrmecia (alga), genus of algae associated with lichens
- Myrmecia (ant), genus of ants called bulldog ants
- Myrmecia (skin), a kind of deep wart on the human hands or feet

== See also ==
- Copromorpha myrmecias or C. myrmecias, a species of moth
- Myrmeciinae, a subfamily of ant
