= Scolioplecta allocotus =

Scientific classification
- Domain: Eukaryota
- Kingdom: Animalia
- Phylum: Arthropoda
- Class: Insecta
- Order: Lepidoptera
- Family: Tortricidae
- Genus: Scolioplecta
- Species: S. allocotus

Binomial name
- Scolioplecta allocotus Common, 1965

Species of moth

Scolioplecta allocotus is a species of moth of the family Tortricidae. It is found in Queensland, Australia.
