= Chersomorpha biocellana =

Scientific classification
- Kingdom: Animalia
- Phylum: Arthropoda
- Class: Insecta
- Order: Lepidoptera
- Family: Tortricidae
- Genus: Chersomorpha
- Species: C. biocellana

Binomial name
- Chersomorpha biocellana (Walker, 1863)

Synonyms
- Carpocapsa biocellana Walker, 1863

Species of moth

Chersomorpha biocellana is a species of moth of the family Tortricidae first described by Francis Walker in 1863. It is found in Papua New Guinea and on Borneo.
