= Chersomorpha taospila =

Scientific classification
- Domain: Eukaryota
- Kingdom: Animalia
- Phylum: Arthropoda
- Class: Insecta
- Order: Lepidoptera
- Family: Tortricidae
- Genus: Chersomorpha
- Species: C. taospila

Binomial name
- Chersomorpha taospila Meyrick, 1926

Species of moth

Chersomorpha taospila is a species of moth of the family Tortricidae. It is found on New Ireland in Papua New Guinea.

The wingspan is about 23 mm. The forewings are ochreous whitish, irregularly mixed light grey, the dorsal half fuscous. The whole wing is strewn with small tufts of raised iridescent blackish scales, edged pale ochreous and arranged in irregular transverse series. The costal edge is irregularly spotted dark fuscous and there is a longitudinal dark fuscous streak, concave above, resting on the median portion of the edge of the fuscous dorsal area. A subquadrate blackish spot edged and cut longitudinally by pale ochreous is found between veins 5 and 7 towards the termen, including a violet-silvery dot in the lower posterior angle and a speck in the upper part anteriorly, and surrounded by fuscous suffusion. There is also a prismatic-silvery line with bright deep blue reflection just before the margin around apex and termen to near the tornus, the margin beyond this fulvous with the edge silvery with dark leaden reflection. The hindwings are rather dark grey.
