= Scolioplecta ochrophylla =

Scientific classification
- Kingdom: Animalia
- Phylum: Arthropoda
- Class: Insecta
- Order: Lepidoptera
- Family: Tortricidae
- Genus: Scolioplecta
- Species: S. ochrophylla

Binomial name
- Scolioplecta ochrophylla Turner, 1916

Synonyms
- Eucosma psammopasta Turner, 1946; Tortrix trimochla Turner, 1945

Species of moth

Scolioplecta ochrophylla is a species of moth of the family Tortricidae. It is found in Australia in Queensland and the Northern Territory.

The wingspan is about 14 mm. The forewings are whitish, with dark fuscous markings, mixed with brownish ochreous. The hindwings are pale grey.
