= Phricanthes argyraetha =

Scientific classification
- Domain: Eukaryota
- Kingdom: Animalia
- Phylum: Arthropoda
- Class: Insecta
- Order: Lepidoptera
- Family: Tortricidae
- Genus: Phricanthes
- Species: P. argyraetha

Binomial name
- Phricanthes argyraetha Diakonoff, 1984

Species of moth

Phricanthes argyraetha is a species of moth of the family Tortricidae. It is found in Sri Lanka.
