= Phricanthes chalcentes =

Scientific classification
- Domain: Eukaryota
- Kingdom: Animalia
- Phylum: Arthropoda
- Class: Insecta
- Order: Lepidoptera
- Family: Tortricidae
- Genus: Phricanthes
- Species: P. chalcentes

Binomial name
- Phricanthes chalcentes Diakonoff, 1983

Species of moth

Phricanthes chalcentes is a species of moth of the family Tortricidae. It is found on Peninsular Malaysia.
