= Scolioplecta rigida =

Scientific classification
- Kingdom: Animalia
- Phylum: Arthropoda
- Class: Insecta
- Order: Lepidoptera
- Family: Tortricidae
- Genus: Scolioplecta
- Species: S. rigida

Binomial name
- Scolioplecta rigida (Meyrick, 1910)

Synonyms
- Cnephasia rigida Meyrick, 1910

Species of moth

Scolioplecta rigida is a species of moth of the family Tortricidae. It is found in Western Australia, Australia.
