= Rhynchoferella syncentra =

Scientific classification
- Kingdom: Animalia
- Phylum: Arthropoda
- Class: Insecta
- Order: Lepidoptera
- Family: Copromorphidae
- Genus: Rhynchoferella
- Species: R. syncentra

Binomial name
- Rhynchoferella syncentra (Meyrick, 1916)

Synonyms
- Sisyroxena syncentra Meyrick, 1916

Species of moth

Rhynchoferella syncentra is a moth of the Copromorphidae family. It is found in Madagascar and South Africa, where it is known from Kwazulu-Natal, Mpumalanga and Gauteng.

Meyrick described this species as follows:

Male 32 mm. Head and thorax pale greyish-ocherous. Abdomen grey. Forewings very elongate-triangular, costa slightly arched, faintly sinuate in middle, apex very obtusely rounded, termen rounded, little oblique; pale brownish-ochreous, irregularly suffused with fuscous towards costa, posterior half of wing sprinkled with dark fuscous specks with some fuscous suffusion, terminal edge suffused with fuscous: cilia fuscous. Hindwings pale greyish; cilia whitish, with faint greyish basal shade.
