= Denaeantha =

Scientific classification
- Kingdom: Animalia
- Phylum: Arthropoda
- Class: Insecta
- Order: Lepidoptera
- Family: Tortricidae
- Tribe: Phricanthini
- Genus: Denaeantha; Diakonoff, 1981

Genus of tortrix moths

Denaeantha is a genus of moths belonging to the family Tortricidae.

== Species ==
- Denaeantha nivigera (Diakonoff, 1941)

== See also ==
- List of Tortricidae genera
