= Copromorpha myrmecias =

Scientific classification
- Kingdom: Animalia
- Phylum: Arthropoda
- Class: Insecta
- Order: Lepidoptera
- Family: Copromorphidae
- Genus: Copromorpha
- Species: C. myrmecias

Binomial name
- Copromorpha myrmecias Meyrick, 1930

Species of moth

Copromorpha myrmecias is a moth in the Copromorphidae family. It is found in India.
