= Cathelotis =

Scientific classification
- Kingdom: Animalia
- Phylum: Arthropoda
- Class: Insecta
- Order: Lepidoptera
- Family: Copromorphidae
- Genus: Cathelotis; Meyrick, 1926
- Species: C. sanidopa

Binomial name
- Cathelotis sanidopa Meyrick, 1926

Genus of moths

Cathelotis is a monotypic moth genus in the family Copromorphidae. Its sole species is Cathelotis sanidopa, which is found in Colombia.

The wingspan is about 23 mm. The forewings are light greyish-ochreous sprinkled fuscous with a patch of fuscous suffusion occupying the costal half from the base to the middle, a cloudy dark fuscous dot on the lower edge of this representing the first discal stigma. There are two transversely placed dark fuscous dots on the end of the cell, the upper transverse-linear. The posterior half of the costa is slenderly suffused pale ochreous, with four fuscous dots. There is a terminal series of cloudy fuscous dots. The hindwings are grey-whitish, more greyish-tinged posteriorly.
