= Osidryas =

Scientific classification
- Kingdom: Animalia
- Phylum: Arthropoda
- Class: Insecta
- Order: Lepidoptera
- Family: Copromorphidae
- Genus: Osidryas; Meyrick, 1916

Synonyms
- Heterocrita Turner, 1913

Genus of moths

Osidryas is a genus of moths in the family Copromorphidae.

== Species ==
- Osidryas chersodes Turner, 1913 (originally in Heterocrita)
- Osidryas chlorotribes Meyrick, 1939
- Osidryas phyllodes Meyrick, 1916
