= Osidryas phyllodes =

Scientific classification
- Kingdom: Animalia
- Phylum: Arthropoda
- Class: Insecta
- Order: Lepidoptera
- Family: Copromorphidae
- Genus: Osidryas
- Species: O. phyllodes

Binomial name
- Osidryas phyllodes Meyrick, 1916

Species of moth

Osidryas phyllodes is a moth in the Copromorphidae family. It is found in Australia, where it has been recorded from Queensland.
