= Scolioplecta comptana =

Scientific classification
- Kingdom: Animalia
- Phylum: Arthropoda
- Class: Insecta
- Order: Lepidoptera
- Family: Tortricidae
- Genus: Scolioplecta
- Species: S. comptana

Binomial name
- Scolioplecta comptana (Walker, 1863)

Synonyms
- Sciaphila comptana Walker, 1863

Species of moth

Scolioplecta comptana is a species of moth of the family Tortricidae. It is found in Australia in Queensland and New South Wales.
