= Scolioplecta molybdantha =

Scientific classification
- Kingdom: Animalia
- Phylum: Arthropoda
- Class: Insecta
- Order: Lepidoptera
- Family: Tortricidae
- Genus: Scolioplecta
- Species: S. molybdantha

Binomial name
- Scolioplecta molybdantha Meyrick, 1910

Synonyms
- Neurospades anagaura Turner, 1945; Tortrix didymosticha Turner, 1945

Species of moth

Scolioplecta molybdantha is a species of moth of the family Tortricidae. It is found in Western Australia, Australia.
