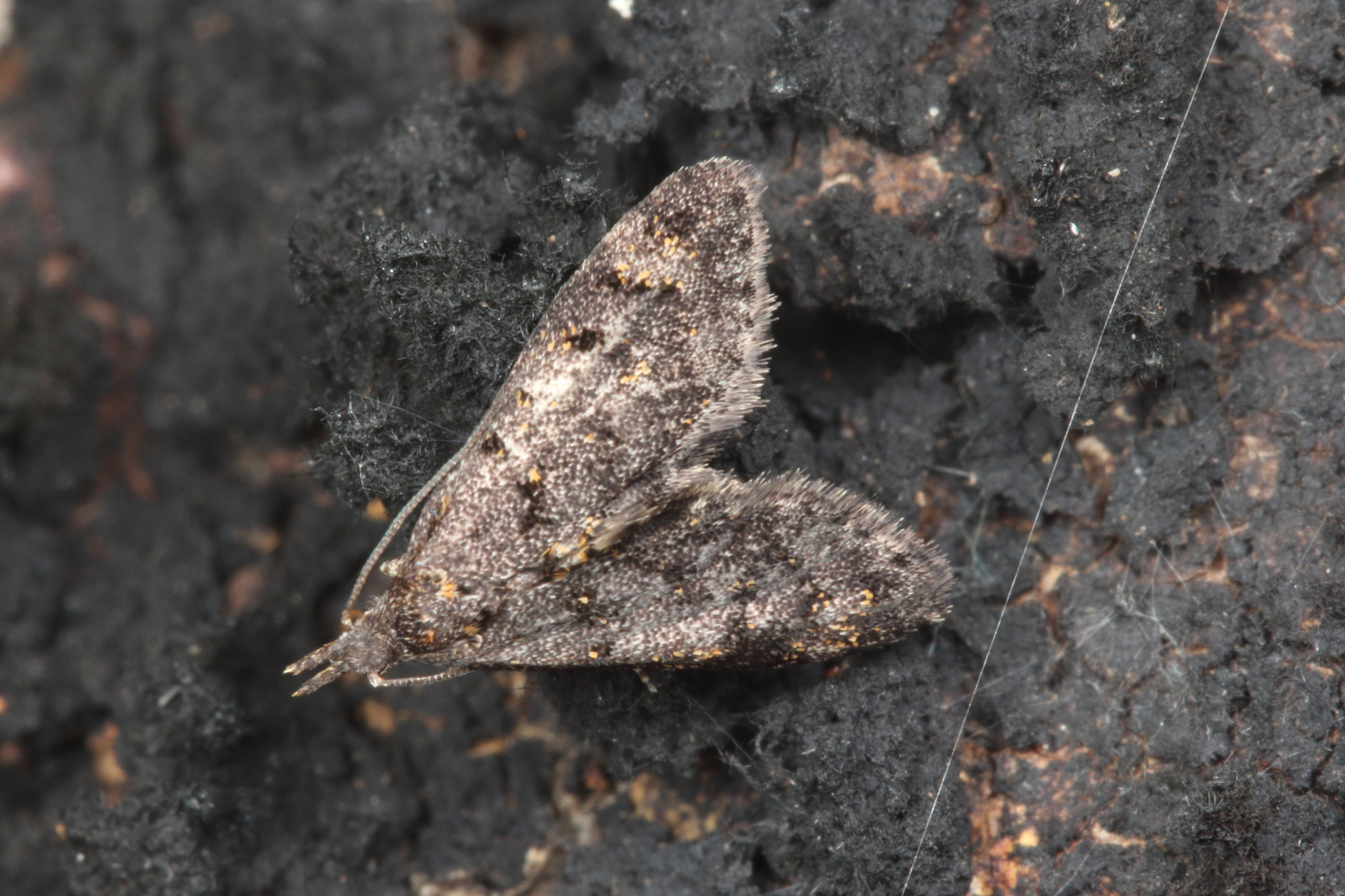
- Isonomeutis amauropa

Scientific classification
- Kingdom: Animalia
- Phylum: Arthropoda
- Class: Insecta
- Order: Lepidoptera
- Family: Copromorphidae
- Genus: Isonomeutis; Meyrick, 1888

= Isonomeutis =

Genus of moths

Isonomeutis is a genus of moths in the Copromorphidae family. All species are endemic to New Zealand.

== Taxonomy ==
This genus was first described by Edward Meyrick in 1888.

== Description ==
Meyrick described the genus as follows:

Forehead with projecting scales. Antennæ in male filiform, shortly ciliated (½). Palpi very long, straight, porrected, with rough projecting scales above and beneath, somewhat attenuated, terminal joint concealed. Thorax smooth. Posterior tibiæ smooth-scaled. Forewings with veins 3 and 4 approximated at base, 7 to hindmargin, surface with small tufts of scales. Hindwings markedly narrower than forewings, rounded; veins 3 and 4 short-stalked, 5, 6, 7 tolerably parallel, lower median naked.

== Species ==
- Isonomeutis amauropa Meyrick, 1888
- Isonomeutis restincta Meyrick, 1923
