= Phanerochersa =

Scientific classification
- Kingdom: Animalia
- Phylum: Arthropoda
- Class: Insecta
- Order: Lepidoptera
- Family: Copromorphidae
- Genus: Phanerochersa; Meyrick, 1926
- Species: P. amphignosta

Binomial name
- Phanerochersa amphignosta Meyrick, 1926

Species of moth

Phanerochersa amphignosta is a moth in the family Copromorphidae, and the only species in the genus Phanerochersa. It is found on New Ireland.

The wingspan is about 16 mm. The forewings are grey somewhat mixed light brownish, with transverse pale leaden striae, and a series of small indistinct black dots between these. The costal edge on the posterior two-thirds is white with black marks and dots and there is an elongate dark grey spot in the middle of the disc, with an elongate white spot resting on it above. The hindwings are grey with an elongate black mark on the tornal edge.
