= Chersomorpha =

Scientific classification
- Kingdom: Animalia
- Phylum: Arthropoda
- Class: Insecta
- Order: Lepidoptera
- Family: Tortricidae
- Tribe: Phricanthini
- Genus: Chersomorpha; Meyrick, 1926

Genus of tortrix moths

Chersomorpha is a genus of moths belonging to the subfamily Tortricinae of the family Tortricidae.

== Species ==
- Chersomorpha biocellana (Walker, 1863)
- Chersomorpha hyphantria Diakonoff, 1984
- Chersomorpha taospila Meyrick, 1926

== See also ==
- List of Tortricidae genera
