= Phricanthini =

Scientific classification
- Domain: Eukaryota
- Kingdom: Animalia
- Phylum: Arthropoda
- Class: Insecta
- Order: Lepidoptera
- Family: Tortricidae
- Subfamily: Tortricinae
- Tribe: Phricanthini; Diakonoff, 1981

Genera
- See text

Tribe of moths

The Phricanthini are a tribe of tortrix moths.

== Genera ==
- Chersomorpha
- Denaeantha
- Phricanthes
- Scolioplecta
