= Phricanthes phaedra =

Scientific classification
- Domain: Eukaryota
- Kingdom: Animalia
- Phylum: Arthropoda
- Class: Insecta
- Order: Lepidoptera
- Family: Tortricidae
- Genus: Phricanthes
- Species: P. phaedra

Binomial name
- Phricanthes phaedra (Diakonoff, 1952)

Synonyms
- Taeniarchis phaedra Diakonoff, 1952

Species of moth

Phricanthes phaedra is a species of moth of the family Tortricidae. It is found in Papua New Guinea.
