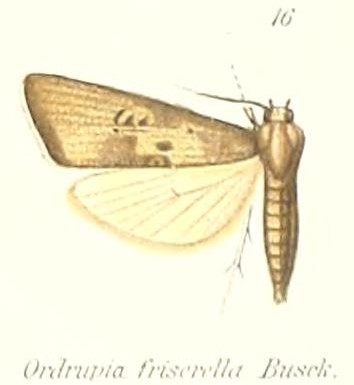
- Ordrupia friserella

Scientific classification
- Domain: Eukaryota
- Kingdom: Animalia
- Phylum: Arthropoda
- Class: Insecta
- Order: Lepidoptera
- Family: Copromorphidae
- Genus: Ordrupia; Busck, 1911

= Ordrupia =

Genus of moths

Ordrupia is a genus of moths in the family Copromorphidae.

== Species ==
- Ordrupia dasyleuca Meyrick, 1926
- Ordrupia fabricata Meyrick, 1915
- Ordrupia fanniella Busck, 1912
- Ordrupia friserella Busck, 1911
- Ordrupia macroctenis Meyrick, 1926
