= Phricanthes petulans =

Scientific classification
- Kingdom: Animalia
- Phylum: Arthropoda
- Class: Insecta
- Order: Lepidoptera
- Family: Tortricidae
- Genus: Phricanthes
- Species: P. petulans

Binomial name
- Phricanthes petulans (Meyrick, 1912)

Synonyms
- Peronea petulans Meyrick, 1912; Taeniarchis argyroiota Diakonoff, 1951

Species of moth

Phricanthes petulans is a species of moth of the family Tortricidae. It is found in India in the state of Assam and in Indonesia on the island of Java.
