= Dryanassa =

Scientific classification
- Kingdom: Animalia
- Phylum: Arthropoda
- Clade: Pancrustacea
- Class: Insecta
- Order: Lepidoptera
- Family: Copromorphidae
- Genus: Dryanassa; Meyrick, 1936
- Species: D. erebactis

Binomial name
- Dryanassa erebactis Meyrick, 1936

Genus of moths

Dryanassa erebactis is a moth in the Copromorphidae family, and the only species in the genus Dryanassa. It is found in Tahiti.
