= Lotisma =

Scientific classification
- Domain: Eukaryota
- Kingdom: Animalia
- Phylum: Arthropoda
- Class: Insecta
- Order: Lepidoptera
- Family: Copromorphidae
- Genus: Lotisma; Busck, 1909

Genus of moths

Lotisma is a genus of moths in the family Copromorphidae.

== Species ==
- Lotisma trigonana (Walsingham, 1879) (originally in Sciaphila)
- Lotisma vulcanica Meyrick, 1932
