= Scolioplecta =

Scientific classification
- Kingdom: Animalia
- Phylum: Arthropoda
- Class: Insecta
- Order: Lepidoptera
- Family: Tortricidae
- Tribe: Phricanthini
- Genus: Scolioplecta; Meyrick, 1881

Synonyms
- Neurospades Turner, 1945

Genus of tortrix moths

Scolioplecta is a genus of moths belonging to the subfamily Tortricinae of the family Tortricidae.

== Species ==
- Scolioplecta allocotus Common, 1965
- Scolioplecta araea Turner, 1916
- Scolioplecta comptana (Walker, 1863)
- Scolioplecta exochus Common, 1965
- Scolioplecta molybdantha Meyrick, 1910
- Scolioplecta ochrophylla Turner, 1916
- Scolioplecta rigida (Meyrick, 1910)

== See also ==
- List of Tortricidae genera
