= Phricanthes =

Scientific classification
- Kingdom: Animalia
- Phylum: Arthropoda
- Class: Insecta
- Order: Lepidoptera
- Family: Tortricidae
- Tribe: Phricanthini
- Genus: Phricanthes; Meyrick, 1881

Synonyms
- Australacleris Diakonoff, 1970; Protypanthes Meyrick, 1933; Protyphanthes Diakonoff, 1939

Genus of tortrix moths

Phricanthes is a genus of moths belonging to the family Tortricidae.

== Species ==
- Phricanthes argyraetha Diakonoff, 1984
- Phricanthes asperana Meyrick, 1881
- Phricanthes chalcentes Diakonoff, 1983
- Phricanthes diaphorus Common, 1965
- Phricanthes eutrachys (Diakonoff, 1948)
- Phricanthes flexilineana (Walker, 1863)
- Phricanthes hybristis (Meyrick, 1933)
- Phricanthes peistica Common, 1965
- Phricanthes petulans (Meyrick, 1912)
- Phricanthes phaedra (Diakonoff, 1952)

== See also ==
- List of Tortricidae genera
