= Osidryas chersodes =

Scientific classification
- Domain: Eukaryota
- Kingdom: Animalia
- Phylum: Arthropoda
- Class: Insecta
- Order: Lepidoptera
- Family: Copromorphidae
- Genus: Osidryas
- Species: O. chersodes

Binomial name
- Osidryas chersodes (Turner, 1913)

Synonyms
- Heterocrita chersodes Turner, 1913

Species of moth

Osidryas chersodes is a moth in the Copromorphidae family. It is found in Australia.
