= Denaeantha nivigera =

Scientific classification
- Kingdom: Animalia
- Phylum: Arthropoda
- Class: Insecta
- Order: Lepidoptera
- Family: Tortricidae
- Genus: Denaeantha
- Species: D. nivigera

Binomial name
- Denaeantha nivigera (Diakonoff, 1941)

Synonyms
- Phricanthes nivigera Diakonoff, 1941; Phricanthes nigivera Brown, 2005

Species of moth

Denaeantha nivigera is a species of moth of the family Tortricidae. It is found on Java.
