= Tanymecica =

Scientific classification
- Kingdom: Animalia
- Phylum: Arthropoda
- Clade: Pancrustacea
- Class: Insecta
- Order: Lepidoptera
- Family: Copromorphidae
- Genus: Tanymecica; Turner, 1916
- Species: T. xanthoplaca

Binomial name
- Tanymecica xanthoplaca Turner, 1916

Genus of moths

Tanymecica xanthoplaca is a moth in the family Copromorphidae, and the only species in the genus Tanymecica. It is found in Australia, where it has been recorded from Queensland.

The wingspan is about 30 mm. The forewings are pale fuscous, with darker fuscous streaks parallel to the veins and a few whitish dots. The basal half of the hindwings is pale-yellow and the terminal half dark-fuscous.
