= Chersomorpha hyphantria =

Scientific classification
- Domain: Eukaryota
- Kingdom: Animalia
- Phylum: Arthropoda
- Class: Insecta
- Order: Lepidoptera
- Family: Tortricidae
- Genus: Chersomorpha
- Species: C. hyphantria

Binomial name
- Chersomorpha hyphantria Diakonoff, 1984

Synonyms
- Copromorpha hyphantria Diakonoff, 1984

Species of moth

Chersomorpha hyphantria is a species of moth of the family Tortricidae. It is found in Papua New Guinea and on Sumba, an island in eastern Indonesia.
