= Saridacma =

Scientific classification
- Kingdom: Animalia
- Phylum: Arthropoda
- Class: Insecta
- Order: Lepidoptera
- Family: Copromorphidae
- Genus: Saridacma; Meyrick, 1930
- Species: S. ilyopis

Binomial name
- Saridacma ilyopis Meyrick, 1930

Genus of moths

Saridacma is a monotypic moth genus in the family Copromorphidae. Its only species, Saridacma ilyopis, is found in Brazil. Both the genus and the species were first described by Edward Meyrick in 1930.
