= Rhopalosetia =

Scientific classification
- Kingdom: Animalia
- Phylum: Arthropoda
- Class: Insecta
- Order: Lepidoptera
- Family: Copromorphidae
- Genus: Rhopalosetia; Meyrick, 1926
- Species: R. phlyctaenopa

Binomial name
- Rhopalosetia phlyctaenopa Meyrick, 1926

Genus of moths

Rhopalosetia is a monotypic moth genus in the family Copromorphidae. Its only species, Rhopalosetia phlyctaenopa, is found in French Guiana. Both the genus and species were first described by Edward Meyrick in 1926.

The wingspan is about 24 mm. The forewings are light brownish ochreous, the costal area and cell tinged with whitish except near the base, the costal edge dark grey throughout. There is a slender dark grey dorsal streak from near the base to three-fourths and from one-fourth to the middle of the costa there are three short indistinct irregular lines of dark fuscous speckling becoming obsolete in the disc. A round whitish submedian spot edged with dark fuscous speckling is found before the middle of the wing, and a more obscure similar spot is located rather obliquely before and above it in the disc. There are two round dark fuscous dots transversely placed on the end of the cell and several small dark grey dots are found in an oblique series from the costa at three-fifths. There are also four cloudy dots of dark fuscous sprinkles in a series near the costa towards the apex. The hindwings are ochreous whitish becoming greyish ochreous posteriorly.
