= Phycomorpha prasinochroa =

Scientific classification
- Kingdom: Animalia
- Phylum: Arthropoda
- Class: Insecta
- Order: Lepidoptera
- Family: Copromorphidae
- Genus: Phycomorpha
- Species: P. prasinochroa

Binomial name
- Phycomorpha prasinochroa (Meyrick, 1906)

Synonyms
- Copromorpha prasinochroa Meyrick, 1906

Species of moth

Phycomorpha prasinochroa is a moth in the Copromorphidae family. It is found in Australia, where it has been recorded from New South Wales and Queensland.
