= Syncamaris =

Scientific classification
- Kingdom: Animalia
- Phylum: Arthropoda
- Class: Insecta
- Order: Lepidoptera
- Family: Copromorphidae
- Genus: Syncamaris; Meyrick, 1932
- Species: S. argophthalma

Binomial name
- Syncamaris argophthalma Meyrick, 1932

Genus of moths

Syncamaris is a monotypic moth genus in the family Copromorphidae. Its only species, Syncamaris argophthalma, is found in Brazil. Both the genus and species were first described by Edward Meyrick in 1932.
