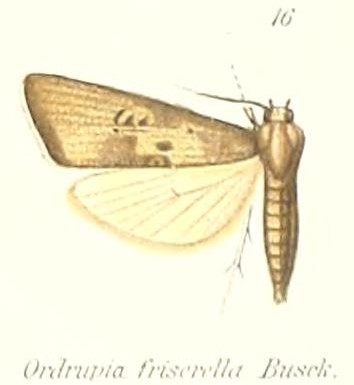

Scientific classification
- Kingdom: Animalia
- Phylum: Arthropoda
- Clade: Pancrustacea
- Class: Insecta
- Order: Lepidoptera
- Infraorder: Heteroneura
- Clade: Eulepidoptera
- Clade: Ditrysia
- Clade: Apoditrysia
- Superfamily: Carposinoidea
- Family: Copromorphidae; Meyrick, 1905

Genera
- See text

= Copromorphidae =

Family of moths

Copromorphidae, the "tropical fruitworm moths", is a family of insects in the lepidopteran order. These moths have broad, rounded forewings, and well-camouflaged scale patterns. Unlike Carposinidae the mouthparts include "labial palps" with the second rather than third segment the longest. With other unusual structural characteristics of the caterpillar and adult, it could represent the sister lineage of all other extant members of this superfamily (Dugdale et al., 1999). The genus Sisyroxena from Madagascar is also notable for its unusual venation and wing scale sockets (Dugdale et al., 1999).

== Etymology ==
The word Copromorphidae derives from the Ancient Greek words κόπρος (copros) meaning "excrement" and μορφή (morphe) meaning "shape" or "appearance", a reference to the visual characteristics of the moths' camouflage.

== Distribution ==
These moths are widely distributed except the Palearctic region, occurring in Madagascar, India, South East Asia, New Guinea, Australia, New Zealand, the Neotropics, with limited temperate region coverage except that the genera Lotisma and Ellabella occur in North America, and the latter also in China (Common, 1990). Over 20 belong to the genus Copromorpha occurring in Indo-Australia (Dugdale et al., 1999).

== Behaviour ==
Adults are night-flying and attracted to lights. Caterpillars live between joined leaves, flowers or fruits or bore within stems, and some eat leaves. The larvae pupate with the silken gallery or descend to the ground and make a cocoon covered in detritus (Dugdale et al., 1999).

== Larval hostplants ==
Caterpillars feed on the families Ericaceae, Moraceae (Ficus) and Berberidaceae. The anomalous genus Isonomeutis is a predator on "scale insects" (Coccoidea; Margarodidae) (Dugdale et al., 1999) on the Podocarpaceae species Dacrydium cupressinum.

== Fossils ==
One fossil taxon is known, Copromorpha fossilis Jarzembowski, 1980 from the "Bembridge Marls" of Isle of Wight, a rock formation of Oligocene age, about 35 million years old (Jarzembowski, 1980).

== Genera ==
The position of the enigmatic New Zealand genus Isonomeutis in this family in uncertain, as it lacks the flimsy cuticle of the pupa characteristic of other Copromorphoidea.

- Copromorpha Meyrick, 1886
  - =Trychnostola Turner, 1916
- Aegidomorpha Meyrick, 1932
- Cathelotis Meyrick, 1926
- Dryanassa Meyrick, 1936
- Ellabella Busck, 1925
  - =Probolacma Meyrick, 1927
  - =Spilogenes Meyrick, 1938
- Endothamna Meyrick, 1922
- Isonomeutis Meyrick, 1888
- Lotisma Busck, 1909
- Neophylarcha Meyrick, 1926
- Ordrupia Busck, 1911
- Osidryas Meyrick, 1916
  - =Heterocrita Turner, 1913
- Phanerochersa Meyrick, 1926
- Phycomorpha Meyrick, 1914
- Rhopalosetia Meyrick, 1926
- Rhynchoferella Strand, 1915
- Saridacma Meyrick, 1930
- Syncamaris Meyrick, 1932
- Tanymecica Turner, 1916

== Formerly placed here ==
- Phaulophara Turner, 1916
