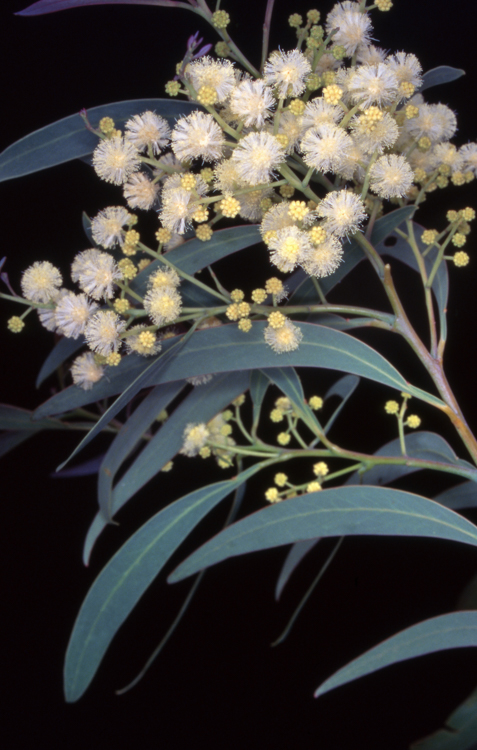

Scientific classification
- Kingdom: Plantae
- Clade: Tracheophytes
- Clade: Angiosperms
- Clade: Eudicots
- Clade: Rosids
- Order: Fabales
- Family: Fabaceae
- Subfamily: Caesalpinioideae
- Clade: Mimosoid clade
- Genus: Acacia
- Species: A. falciformis

Binomial name
- Acacia falciformis DC.
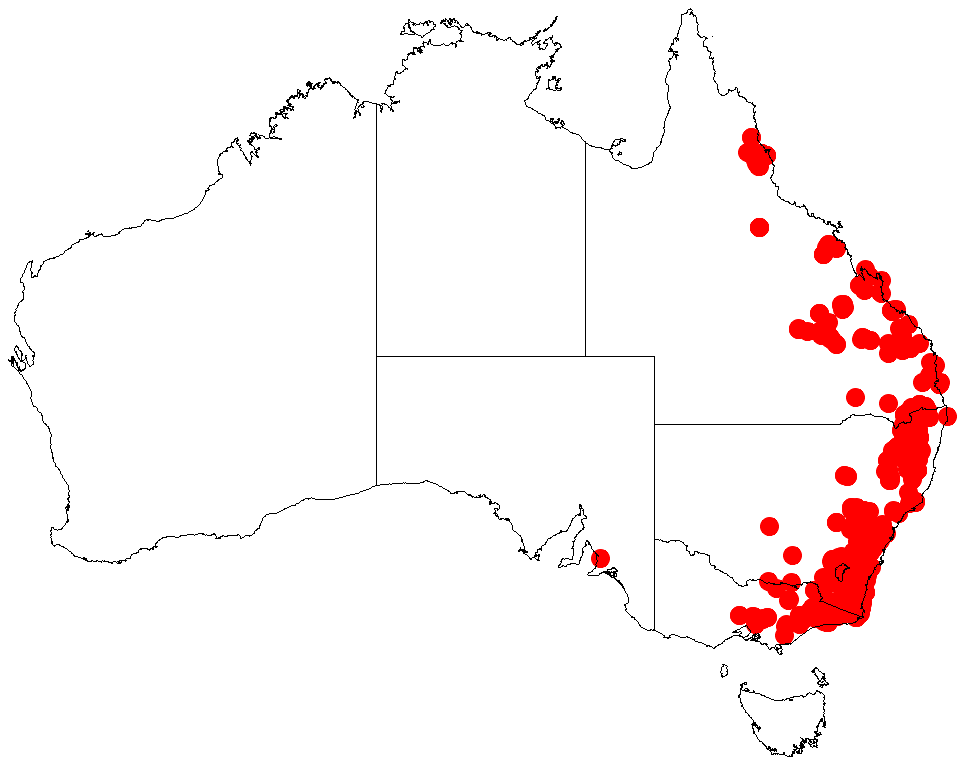
- Occurrence data from AVH

Synonyms
- List: Acacia astringens G.Don; Acacia falciformis DC. var. falciformis; Acacia penninervis var. falciformis (DC.) Benth.; Acacia penninervis var. normalis R.T.Baker; Racosperma falciforme (DC.) Pedley

= Acacia falciformis =

Hickory wattle

Species of legume

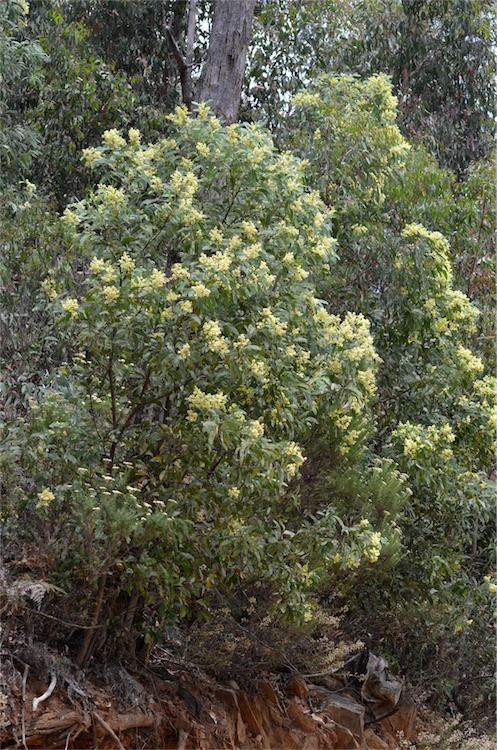
Habit in Namadgi National Park

Acacia falciformis, commonly known as mountain hickory, broad-leaved hickory, hickory wattle, black wattle, tanning wattle or large-leaf hickory wattle, is a species of flowering plant in the family Fabaceae and is endemic to eastern continental Australia. It is a shrub or tree, with glabrous branchlets, usually sickle-shaped phyllodes, spherical heads of creamy yellow flowers and thinly leathery, glabrous pods.

== Description ==
Acacia falciformis is an erect or spreading shrub or tree that typically grows to a height of 2–10 m (6 ft 7 in – 32 ft 10 in), sometimes higher, and has finely or deeply fissured, grey-black bark. Its branchlets are glabrous, angled at first but soon terete. The phyllodes are more or less pendulous, usually sickle-shaped, 100–220 mm (3.9–8.7 in) long, 15–30 mm (0.59–1.18 in) wide, grey-green to glaucous, and glabrous. There is a prominent midrib, and a gland 5–30 mm (0.20–1.18 in) above the base of the phyllodes.

The flowers are borne in five to eighteen spherical heads in racemes in axils, sometimes in panicles on the ends of branches, on peduncles 4–10 mm (0.16–0.39 in) long. Each head has 20 to 30 pale yellow to cream coloured or sometimes bright yellow flowers. Flowering occurs from July to October, mostly in August and September, and the pods are 5–13 mm (0.20–0.51 in) long and 50–130 mm (2.0–5.1 in) long, 5.5–9 mm (0.22–0.35 in) wide, flat and more or less straight or slightly curved. The pods are thinly leathery, slightly or more deeply constricted between some seeds. The seeds are oblong to more or less elliptic, 5.5–7 mm (0.22–0.28 in) long, slightly shiny black, with a club-shaped aril.

== Taxonomy ==
The species was first formally described in 1825 by the botanist Augustin Pyramus de Candolle in his Prodromus Systematis Naturalis Regni Vegetabilis from specimens collected by Franz Sieber. The specific epithet (falciformis) refers to the falcate shape of the phyllodes.

This species is similar in appearance to Acacia penninervis and Acacia obliquinervia. It can also form hybrids with Acacia bancroftiorum.

== Distribution and habitat ==
Mountain hickory is common on the tablelands and slopes of the Great Dividing Range, mostly at altitudes between 800 and 1,200 m (2,600 and 3,900 ft), from Traralgon in Victoria through New South Wales and the Australian Capital Territory to the Atherton Tableland in Queensland, although it is uncommon north of Warwick. It grows in clay loam in forest or woodland, often in moist gullies or in exposed rocky sites.

== See also ==
- List of Acacia species
