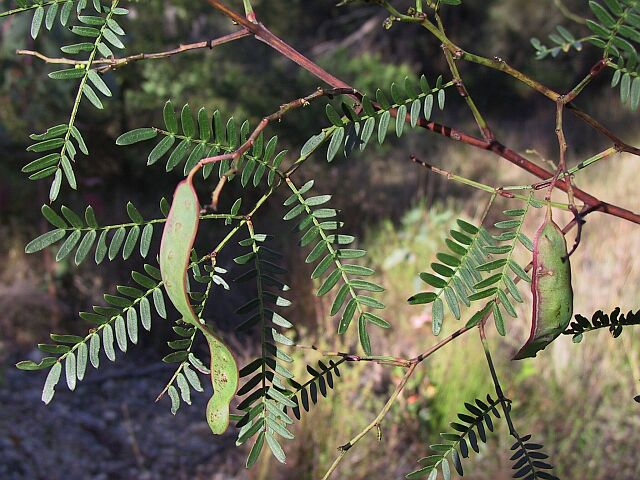

Scientific classification
- Kingdom: Plantae
- Clade: Embryophytes
- Clade: Tracheophytes
- Clade: Angiosperms
- Clade: Eudicots
- Clade: Rosids
- Order: Fabales
- Family: Fabaceae
- Subfamily: Caesalpinioideae
- Clade: Mimosoid clade
- Genus: Acacia
- Species: A. terminalis

Binomial name
- Acacia terminalis (Salisb.) J.F.Macbr.
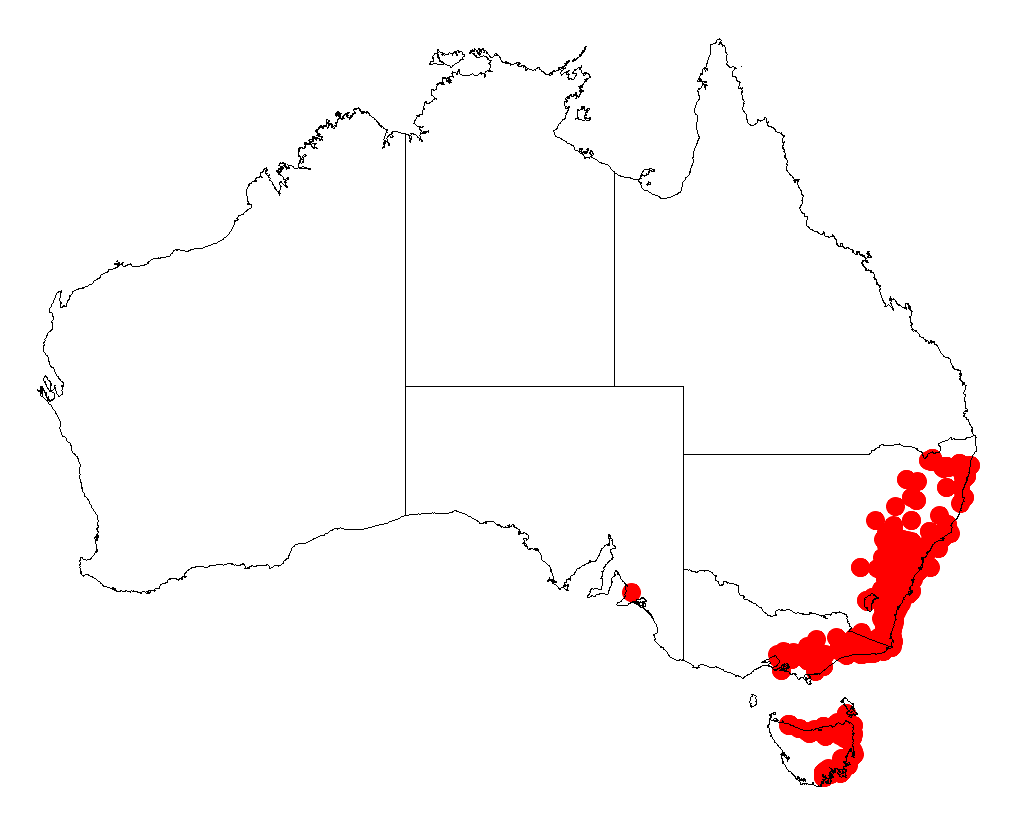
- Occurrence data from AVH

= Acacia terminalis =

Sunshine wattle

Species of legume

Acacia terminalis (sunshine wattle) is a shrub or small tree to 6 m in height. It is an Australian native whose range extends through New South Wales, Victoria and Tasmania. Common names are cedar wattle (also used of Acacia elata), elata wattle, mountain hickory (also used of Acacia obliquinervia) and peppermint-tree wattle.

Four subspecies have been recognised, although there are additional hybrids, especially around Sydney:

- A. terminalis subsp. angustifolia
- A. terminalis subsp. aurea
- A. terminalis subsp. longiaxialis
- A. terminalis subsp. terminalis: listed as an endangered species under the Commonwealth Environment Protection and Biodiversity Conservation Act 1999. It is rare and confined to the Eastern suburbs of Sydney, between Cronulla and Manly. It differs from the other forms of the species in being hairier, and having thicker peduncles and wider seed pods.

== Image gallery ==
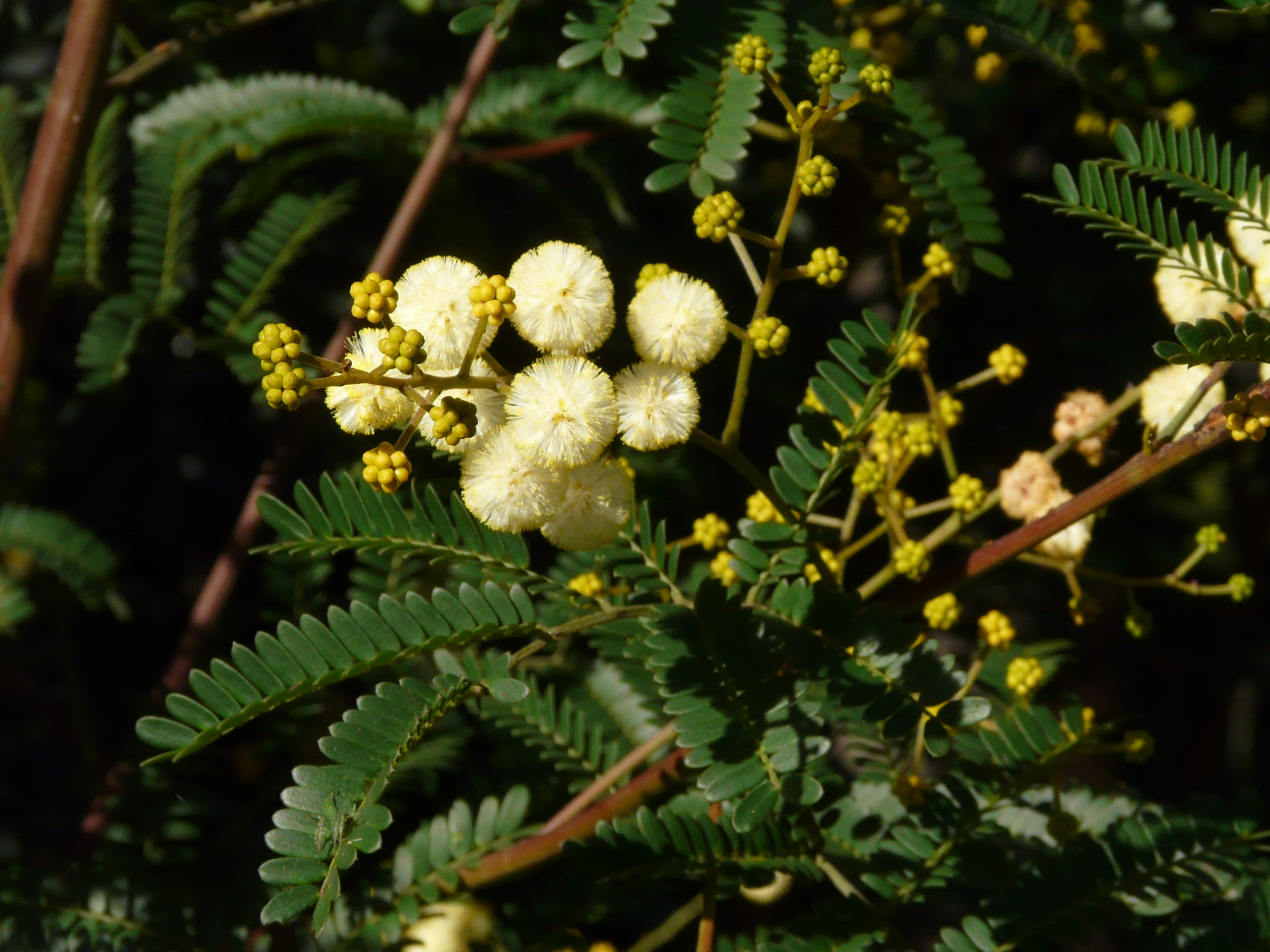

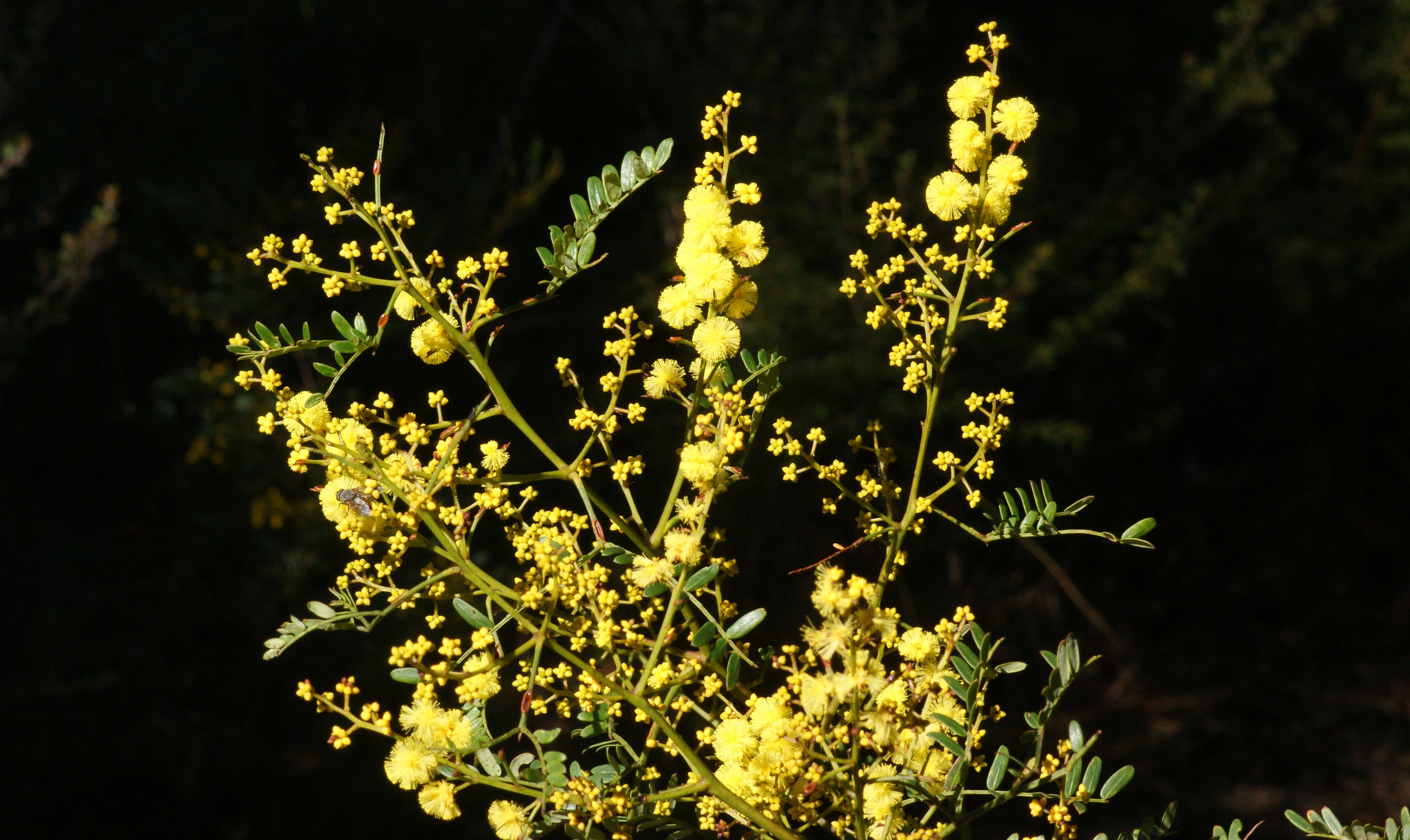

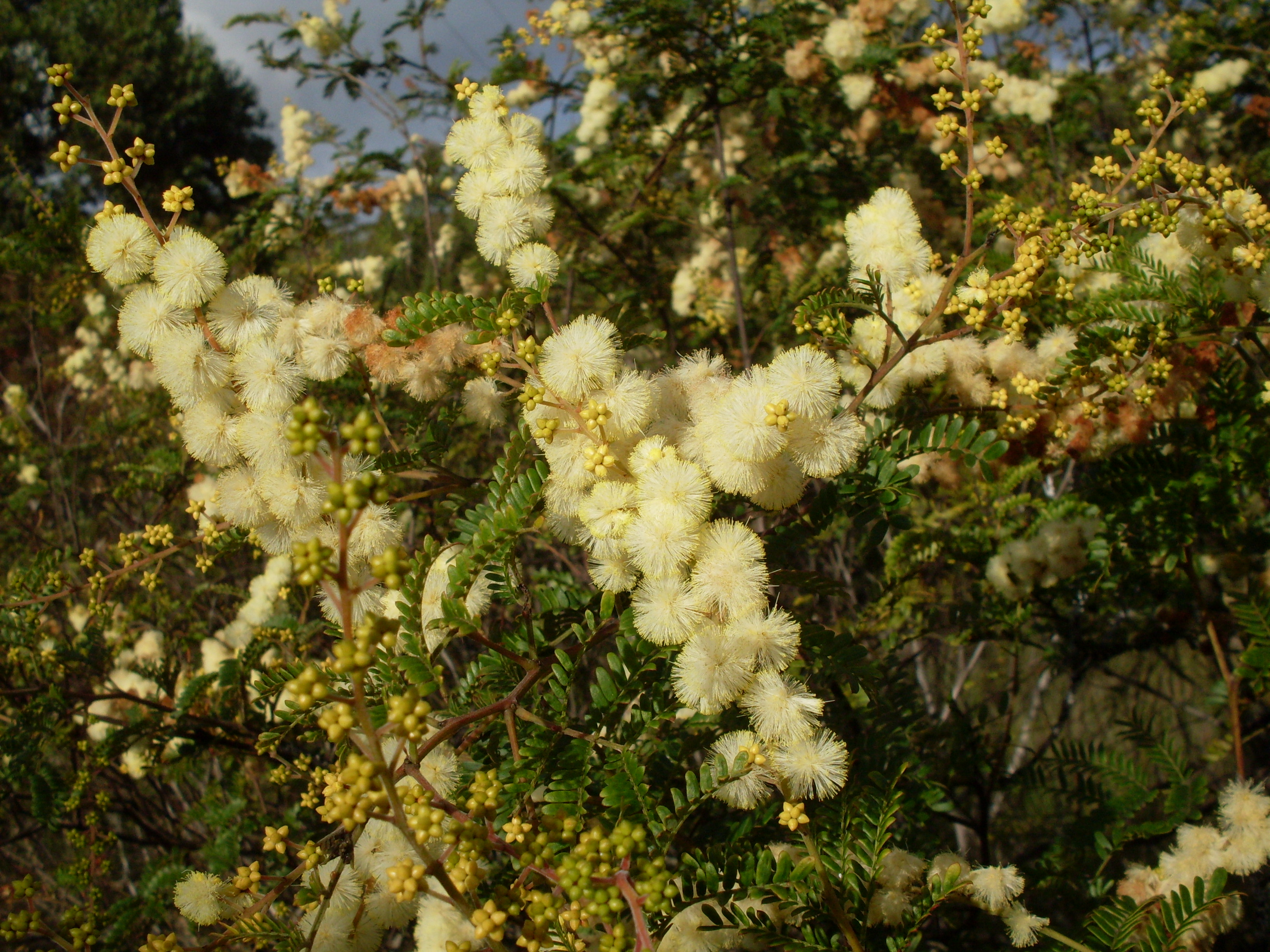

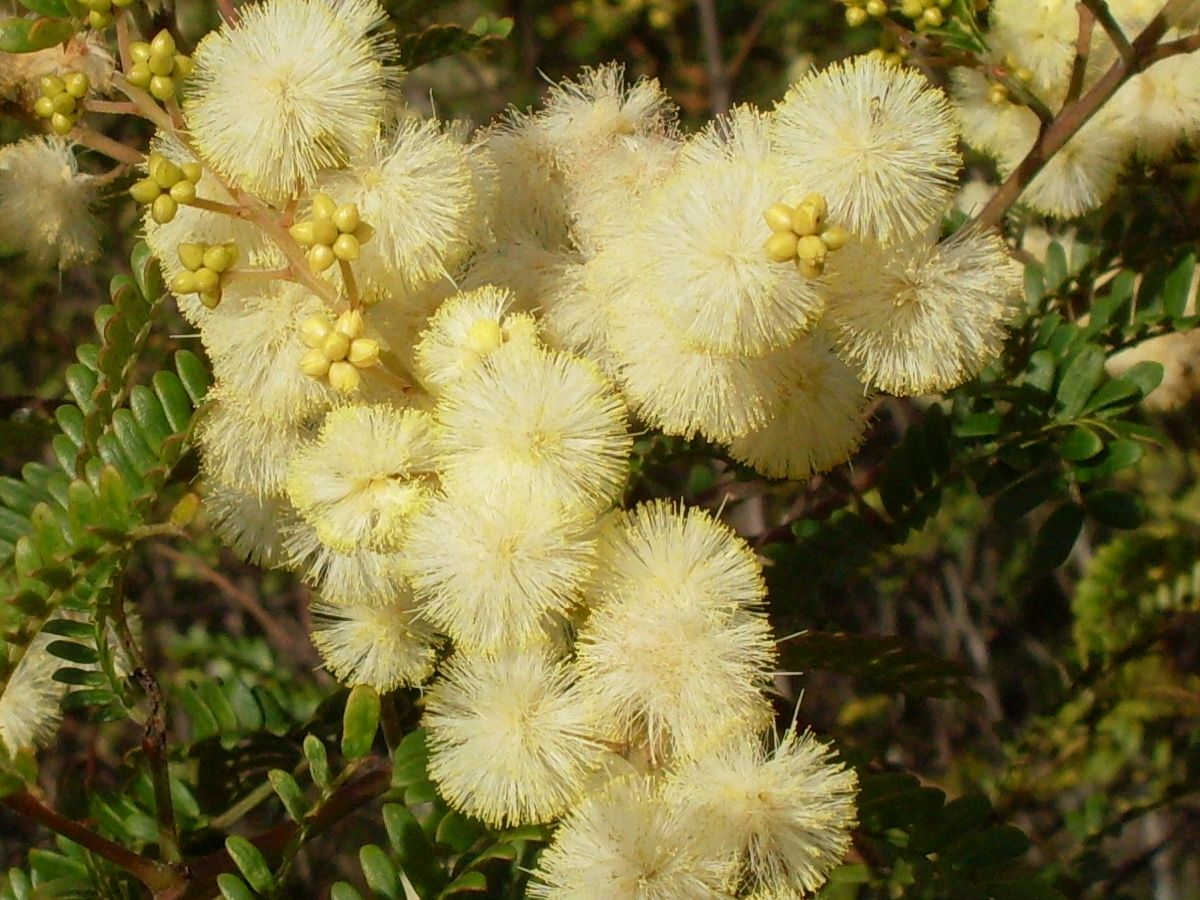

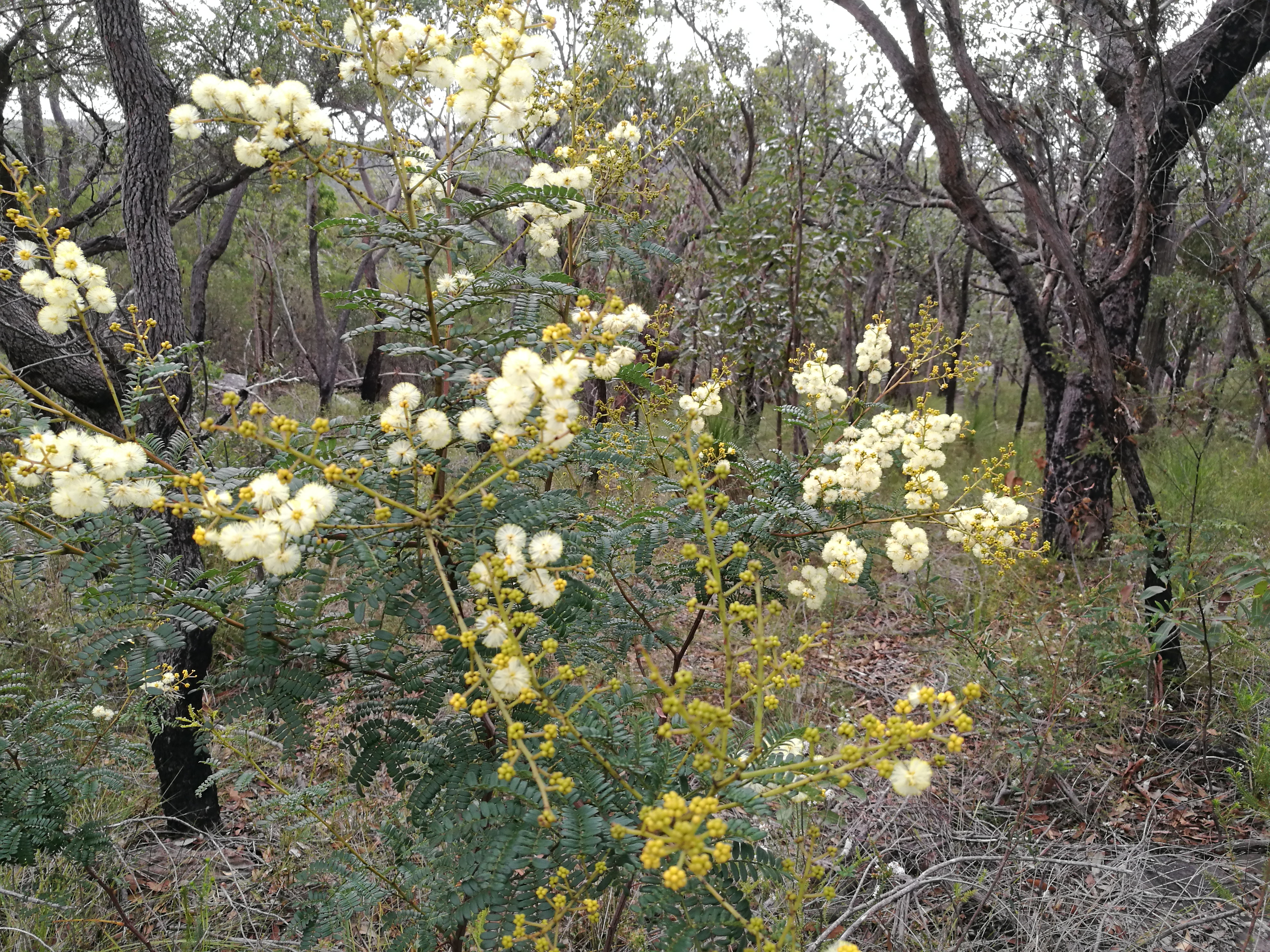
