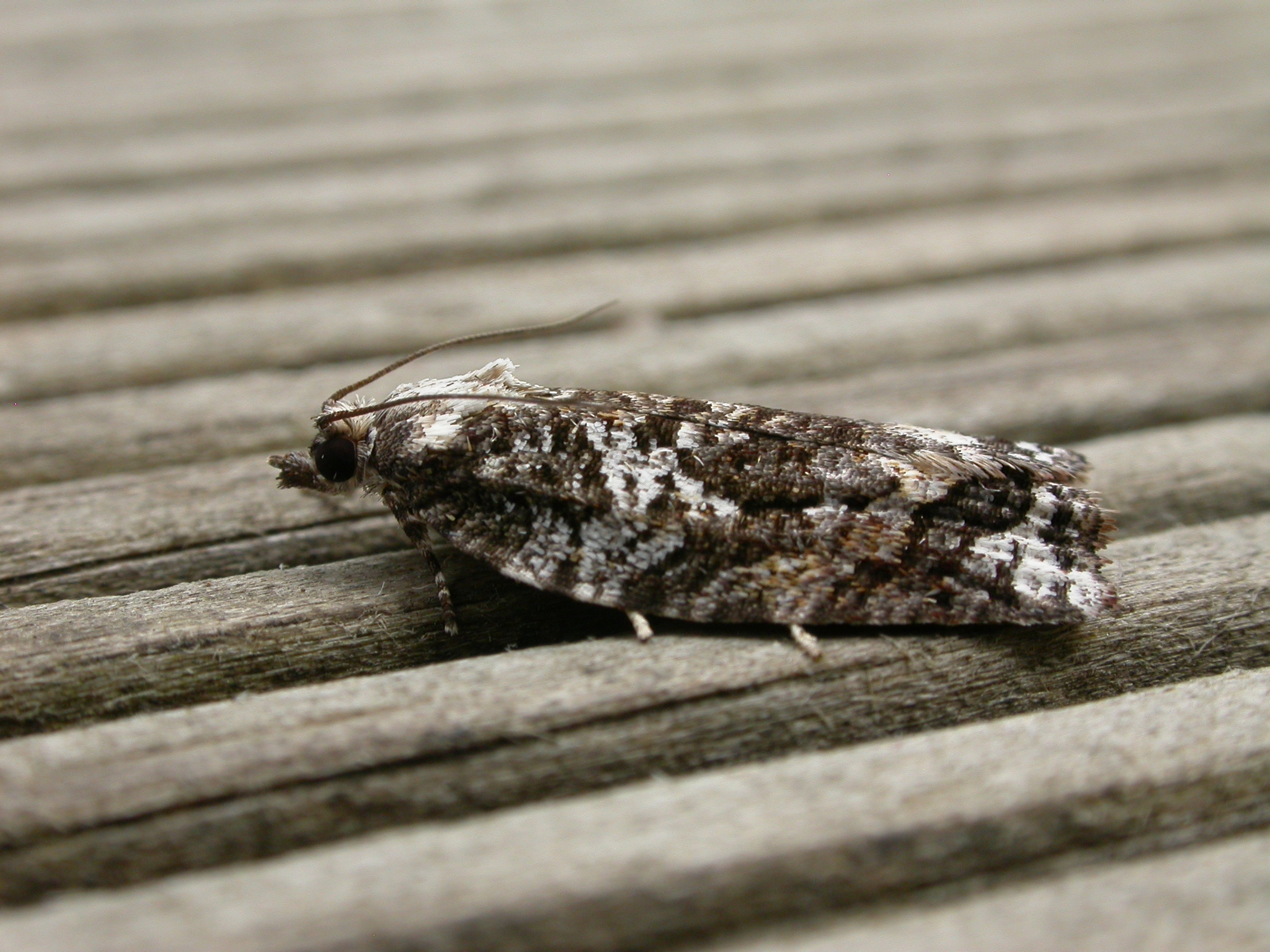

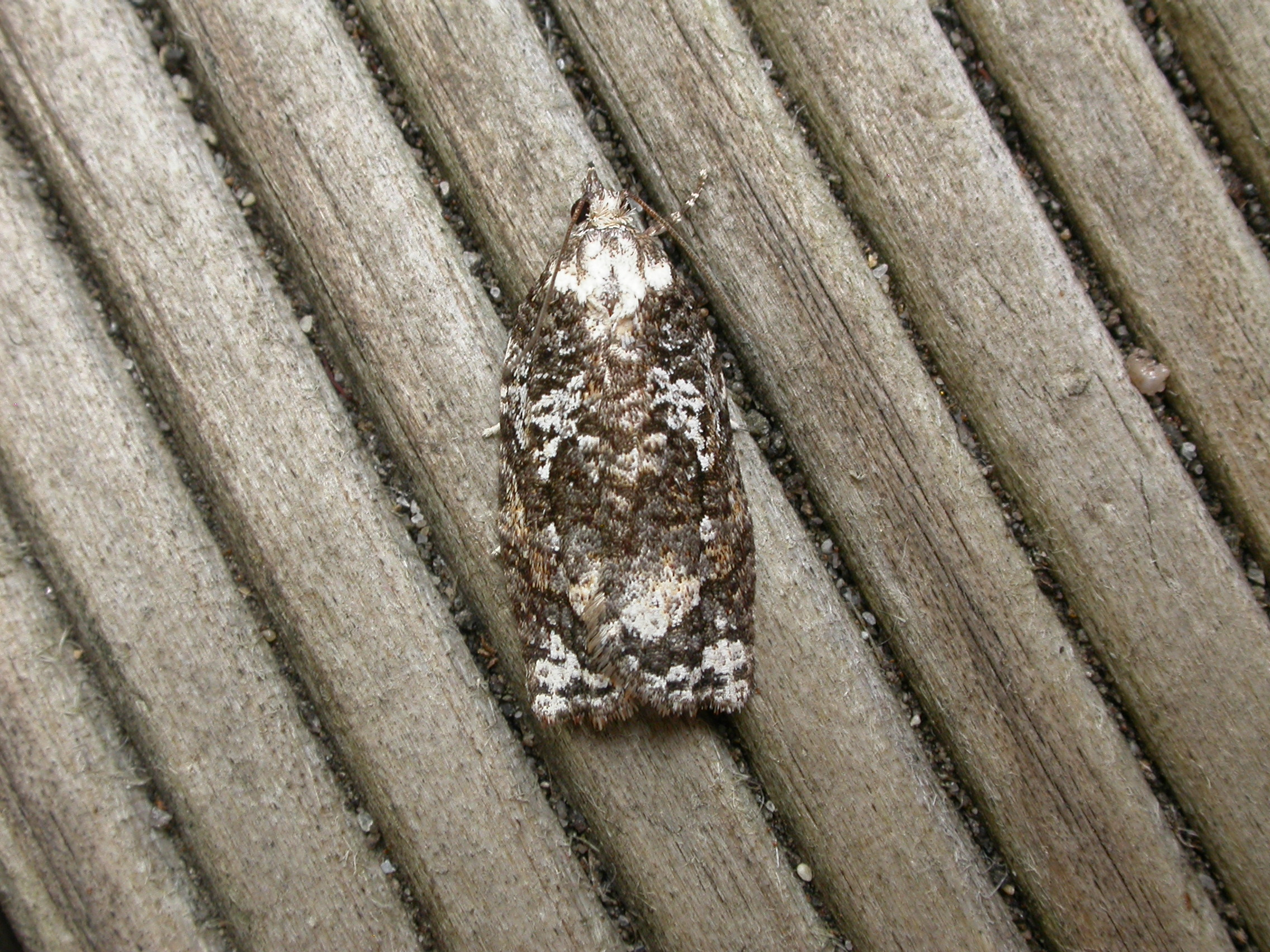

Scientific classification
- Kingdom: Animalia
- Phylum: Arthropoda
- Class: Insecta
- Order: Lepidoptera
- Family: Tortricidae
- Genus: Thrincophora
- Species: T. signigerana

Binomial name
- Thrincophora signigerana (Walker, 1863)

Synonyms
- Tortrix signigerana Walker, 1863

= Thrincophora signigerana =

Species of moth

Thrincophora signigerana is a species of moth of the family Tortricidae. It is found in Australia (including South Australia, Victoria and Tasmania).

The wingspan is about 30 mm.

The larvae feed within the seedpods of Acacia obliquinervia.
