= Thrincophora inconcisana =

Scientific classification
- Kingdom: Animalia
- Phylum: Arthropoda
- Class: Insecta
- Order: Lepidoptera
- Family: Tortricidae
- Genus: Thrincophora
- Species: T. inconcisana

Binomial name
- Thrincophora inconcisana (Walker, 1863)

Synonyms
- Sciaphila inconcisana Walker, 1863; Acropolitis cerasta Meyrick, 1910

Species of moth

Thrincophora inconcisana is a moth of the family Tortricidae. It is found in Australia (including Queensland and New South Wales).
