= Thrincophora archboldi =

Scientific classification
- Domain: Eukaryota
- Kingdom: Animalia
- Phylum: Arthropoda
- Class: Insecta
- Order: Lepidoptera
- Family: Tortricidae
- Genus: Thrincophora
- Species: T. archboldi

Binomial name
- Thrincophora archboldi Diakonoff, 1952

Species of moth

Thrincophora archboldi is a moth of the family Tortricidae. It is found in New Guinea.
