= Thrincophora ostracopis =

Scientific classification
- Kingdom: Animalia
- Phylum: Arthropoda
- Class: Insecta
- Order: Lepidoptera
- Family: Tortricidae
- Genus: Thrincophora
- Species: T. ostracopis

Binomial name
- Thrincophora ostracopis (Meyrick, 1938)

Synonyms
- Anisochorista ostracopis Meyrick, 1938

Species of moth

Thrincophora ostracopis is a moth of the family Tortricidae first described by Edward Meyrick in 1938. It is found on Seram and on New Guinea, where it has been recorded from Papua north-west New Guinea. The habitat consists of lower montane forests.
