= Thrincophora cinefacta =

Scientific classification
- Domain: Eukaryota
- Kingdom: Animalia
- Phylum: Arthropoda
- Class: Insecta
- Order: Lepidoptera
- Family: Tortricidae
- Genus: Thrincophora
- Species: T. cinefacta

Binomial name
- Thrincophora cinefacta (Turner, 1945)

Synonyms
- Acropolitis cinefacta Turner, 1945

Species of moth

Thrincophora cinefacta is a moth of the family Tortricidae. It is found in Australia (including Queensland and New South Wales).
