= Thrincophora impletana =

Scientific classification
- Kingdom: Animalia
- Phylum: Arthropoda
- Class: Insecta
- Order: Lepidoptera
- Family: Tortricidae
- Genus: Thrincophora
- Species: T. impletana

Binomial name
- Thrincophora impletana (Walker, 1863)

Synonyms
- Tortrix impletana Walker, 1863; Tortrix dolosana Walker, 1863

Species of moth

Thrincophora impletana is a moth of the family Tortricidae. It is found in Australia (including the Australian Capital Territory and Tasmania).

The wingspan is about 28 mm.
