= Thrincophora dryinodes =

Scientific classification
- Kingdom: Animalia
- Phylum: Arthropoda
- Class: Insecta
- Order: Lepidoptera
- Family: Tortricidae
- Genus: Thrincophora
- Species: T. dryinodes

Binomial name
- Thrincophora dryinodes (Meyrick, 1910)

Synonyms
- Acropolitis dryinodes Meyrick, 1910

Species of moth

Thrincophora dryinodes is a moth of the family Tortricidae. It is found in Australia (including Victoria, the Australian Capital Territory and New South Wales).
