= Thrincophora stenoptycha =

Scientific classification
- Domain: Eukaryota
- Kingdom: Animalia
- Phylum: Arthropoda
- Class: Insecta
- Order: Lepidoptera
- Family: Tortricidae
- Genus: Thrincophora
- Species: T. stenoptycha

Binomial name
- Thrincophora stenoptycha (Turner, 1926)

Synonyms
- Acropolitis stenoptycha Turner, 1926

Species of moth

Thrincophora stenoptycha is a moth of the family Tortricidae. It is found in Australia (including Queensland).

The wingspan is about 20 mm. The forewings are whitish with uneven fuscous irroration and strigulation and with dark fuscous markings. The hindwings are pale grey.
