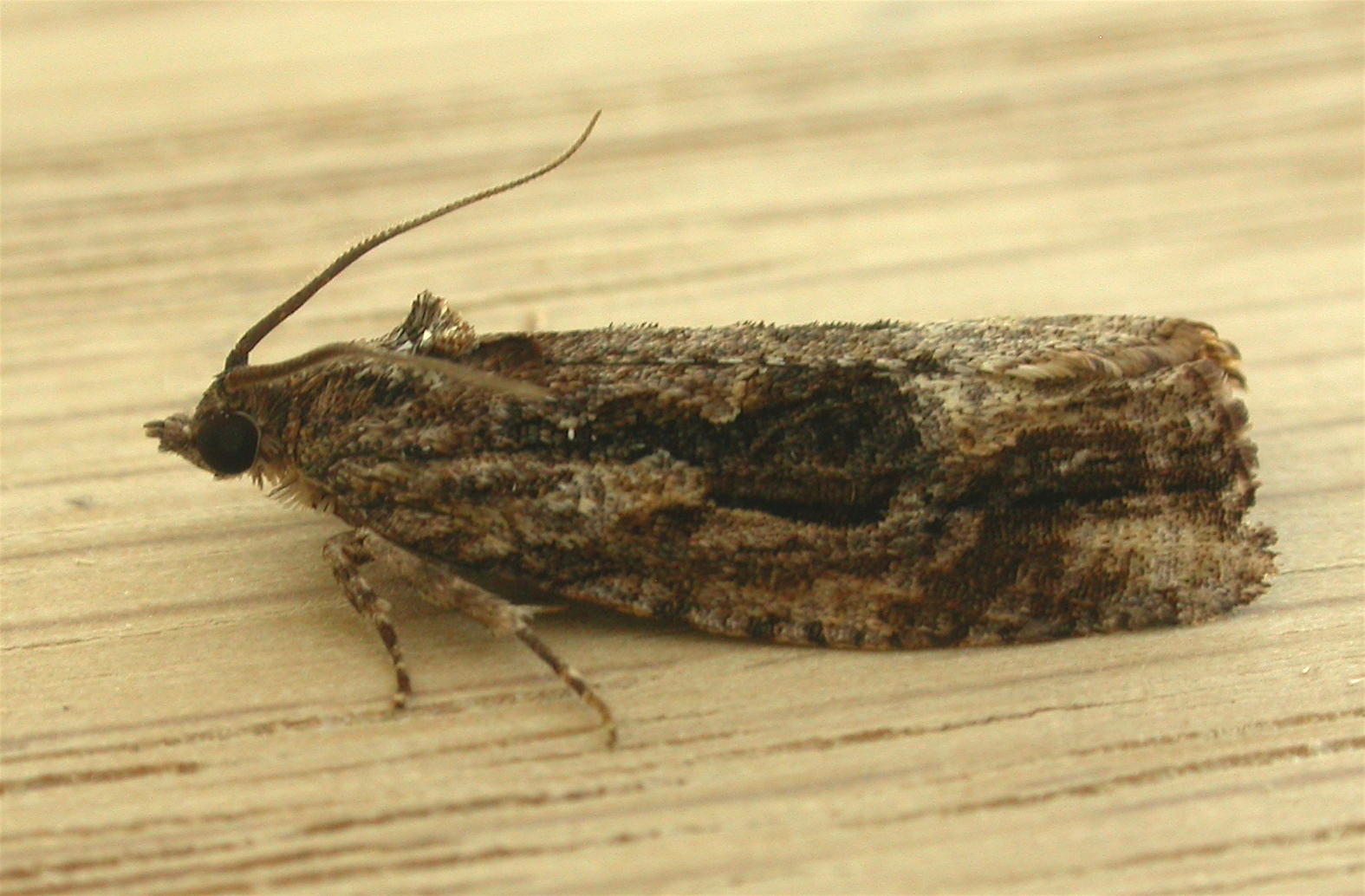

Scientific classification
- Kingdom: Animalia
- Phylum: Arthropoda
- Class: Insecta
- Order: Lepidoptera
- Family: Tortricidae
- Genus: Thrincophora
- Species: T. lignigerana

Binomial name
- Thrincophora lignigerana (Walker, 1863)

Synonyms
- Acropolitis tetrica Turner, 1916; Paedisca lignigerana Walker, 1863

= Thrincophora lignigerana =

Species of moth

Thrincophora lignigerana is a moth of the family Tortricidae. It is found in Australia, including Tasmania and South Australia.

The wingspan is about 28 mm. The forewings are whitish-brown suffused and irregularly spotted and blotched with dark fuscous-brown. The hindwings are pale-grey, with faintly darker strigulae.
