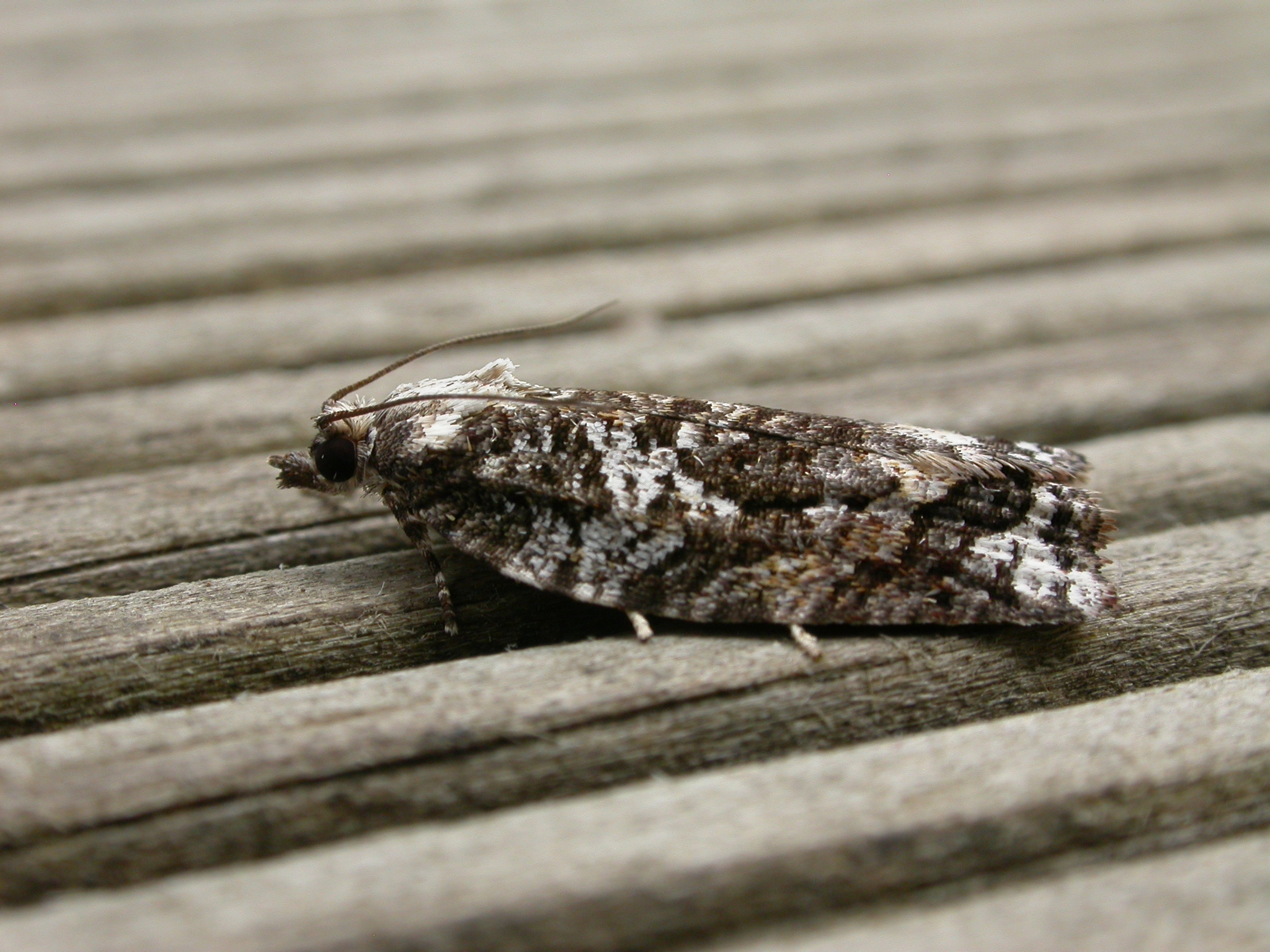
- Thrincophora signigerana

Scientific classification
- Kingdom: Animalia
- Phylum: Arthropoda
- Class: Insecta
- Order: Lepidoptera
- Family: Tortricidae
- Subfamily: Tortricinae
- Tribe: Archipini
- Genus: Thrincophora; Meyrick, 1881

= Thrincophora =

Genus of tortrix moths

Thrincophora is a genus of moths belonging to the subfamily Tortricinae of the family Tortricidae.

== Species ==
- Thrincophora archboldi Diakonoff, 1952
- Thrincophora cinefacta (Turner, 1945)
- Thrincophora deloptycha Diakonoff, 1952
- Thrincophora dryinodes (Meyrick, 1910)
- Thrincophora impletana (Walker, 1863)
- Thrincophora inconcisana (Walker, 1863)
- Thrincophora leucotorna Diakonoff, 1952
- Thrincophora lignigerana (Walker, 1863)
- Thrincophora microtera Diakonoff, 1952
- Thrincophora nebulosa Diakonoff, 1952
- Thrincophora ochracea Diakonoff, 1944
- Thrincophora ostracopis (Meyrick, 1938)
- Thrincophora signigerana (Walker, 1863)
- Thrincophora stenoptycha (Turner, 1926)

== See also ==
- List of Tortricidae genera
