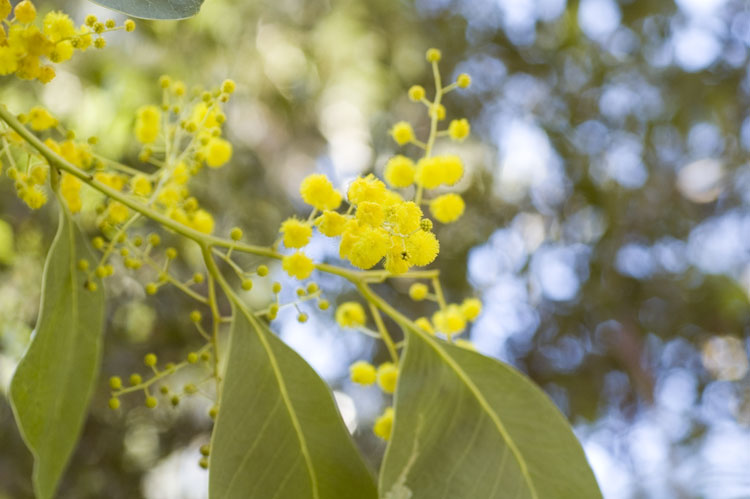
- In the ANBG

Scientific classification
- Kingdom: Plantae
- Clade: Tracheophytes
- Clade: Angiosperms
- Clade: Eudicots
- Clade: Rosids
- Order: Fabales
- Family: Fabaceae
- Subfamily: Caesalpinioideae
- Clade: Mimosoid clade
- Genus: Acacia
- Species: A. bancroftiorum

Binomial name
- Acacia bancroftiorum Maiden
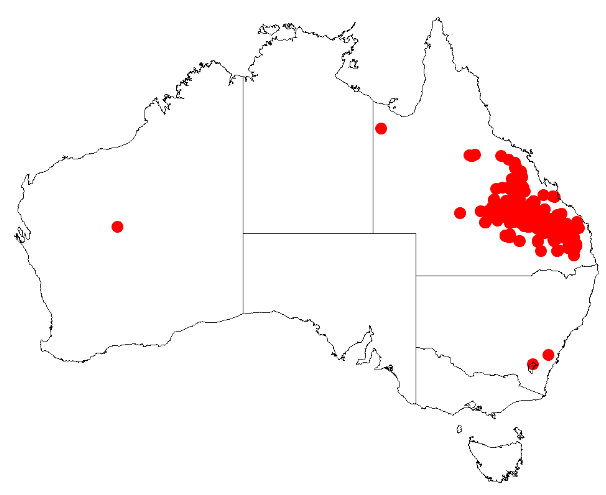
- Occurrence data from AVH

= Acacia bancroftiorum =

Species of shrub

Acacia bancroftiorum, commonly known as Bancroft's wattle, is a species of flowering plant in the family Fabaceae and is endemic to Queensland. It is a spindly shrub or slender tree with narrowly elliptic to egg-shaped phyllodes with the narrower end towards the base, racemes of spherical heads of pale lemon-yellow to golden yellow flowers, and thin leathery pods up to 220 mm (8.7 in) long.

== Description ==
Acacia bancroftiorum is a spindly shrub or slender tree that typically grows to a height of up to 6 m (20 ft) and has dark reddish, glabrous branchlets. Its phyllodes are obliquely egg-shaped with the narrower end towards the base, or narrowly elliptic, 90–220 mm (3.5–8.7 in) long and 25–80 mm (0.98–3.15 in) wide, usually glaucous, with a prominent midrib. The flowers are borne in spherical head in racemes 30–80 mm (1.2–3.1 in) long on a peduncle 4–8 mm (0.16–0.31 in) long, each head with 25 to 40 pale lemon-yellow or golden yellow flowers. Flowering has been recorded from January to September, and the pods are thinly leathery, up to 220 mm (8.7 in) long and 9–15 mm (0.35–0.59 in) wide with oblong to elliptic seeds, 6–9 mm (0.24–0.35 in) long and black.

== Taxonomy ==
Acacia bancroftiorum was first formally described in 1918 by Joseph Maiden in the Proceedings of the Royal Society of Queensland from specimens collected from dry ridges at Beta (291 mi (468 km) from Rockhampton), by John Luke Boorman in 1913. The specific epithet (bancroftianum) honours Joseph Bancroft and his son Thomas Lane Bancroft.

== Distribution and habitat ==
Bancroft's wattle usually grows in shallow soil on rocky hillsides in woodland or open forest and is common between Collinsville and Crows Nest but is also known from near Tambo and White Mountains National Park.

== Conservation status ==
Acacia bancroftiorum is listed as of "least concern" under the Queensland Government Nature Conservation Act 1992.

== See also ==
- List of Acacia species
