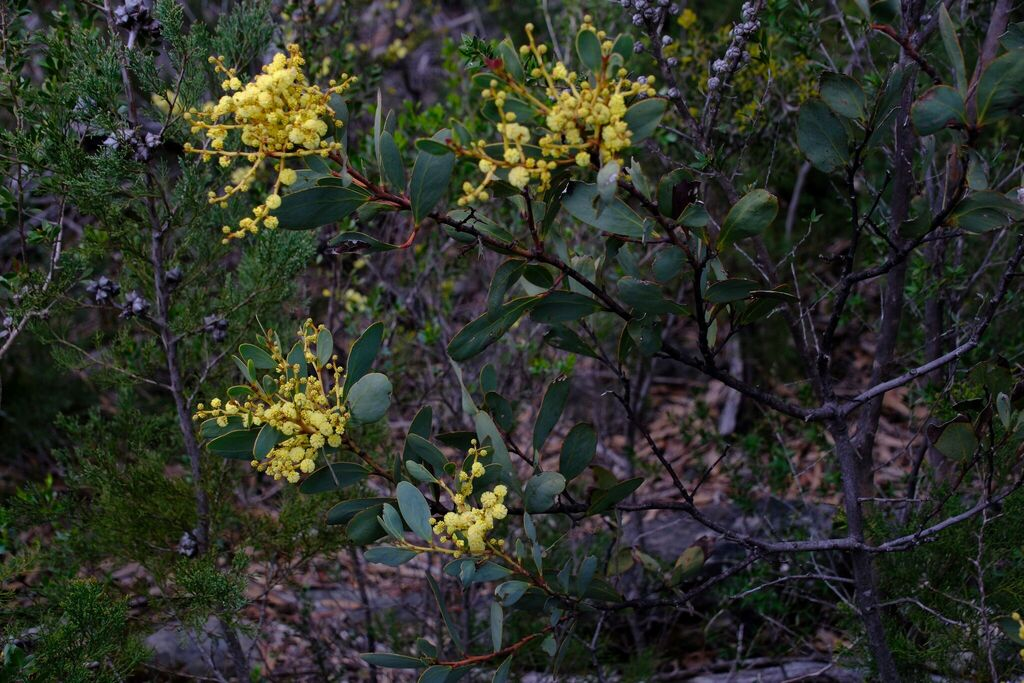
- Near Halls Gap

Conservation status
- Least Concern (IUCN 3.1)

Scientific classification
- Kingdom: Plantae
- Clade: Tracheophytes
- Clade: Angiosperms
- Clade: Eudicots
- Clade: Rosids
- Order: Fabales
- Family: Fabaceae
- Subfamily: Caesalpinioideae
- Clade: Mimosoid clade
- Genus: Acacia
- Species: A. obliquinervia

Binomial name
- Acacia obliquinervia Tindale
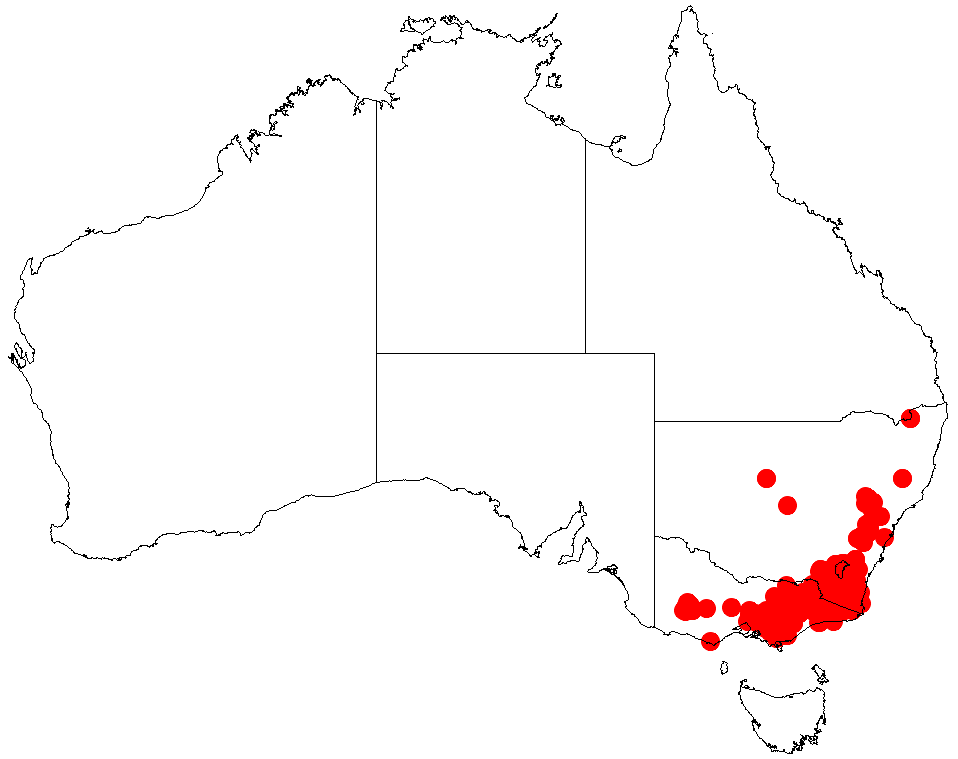
- Occurrence data from AVH

Synonyms
- ? Acacia penninervis var. glauca R.T.Baker; ? Acacia pycnantha var. latissima Hochr; Racosperma obliquinervium (Tindale) Pedley

= Acacia obliquinervia =

Mountain hickory

Species of legume

Acacia obliquinervia, known colloquially as mountain hickory or mountain hickory wattle, is a species of flowering plant in the family Fabaceae, and is endemic to the south-east of mainland Australia. It is a shrub or tree with egg-shaped to lance-shaped phyllodes with the narrower end towards the base, racemes of spherical heads of bright golden or lemon yellow flowers and papery to thinly leathery pods.

== Description ==
Acacia obliquinervia is a shrub or tree that typically grows to a height of 1–15 m (3 ft 3 in – 49 ft 3 in) and has deeply fissured dark brown bark and glabrous branchlets often covered with a white, powdery bloom. Its phyllodes are egg-shaped to lance-shaped with the narrower end towards the base, 50–170 mm (2.0–6.7 in) long, 15–50 mm (0.59–1.97 in) wide, narrowed or turned down at the base, with a prominent midrib towards the lower edge and a gland up to 12 mm (0.47 in) above the pulvinus. The flowers are arranged in spherical heads in racemes 20–100 mm (0.79–3.94 in) long on stout, usually glabrous peduncles 1.5–5 mm (0.059–0.197 in) long. Each head has 20 to 35 bright golden or lemon yellow flowers. Flowering usually occurs from August to December, and the pods are 40–150 mm (1.6–5.9 in) long, 12–25 mm (0.47–0.98 in) wide, stalked, papery to thinly leathery and slightly raised over the seeds.

== Taxonomy ==
Acacia obliquinervia was first formally described by Mary Tindale in Contributions from the New South Wales National Herbarium from specimens collected on Mount Saint Leonard, 6 mi (9.7 km) north of Healesville by Ernest Francis Constable in 1964. The specific epithet (obliquinervia) refers to the oblique venation of the phyllodes.

== Distribution and habitat ==
Mountain hickory grows in forest, often on sandstone, mainly on the tablelands of New South Wales south from the Goulburn River valley through the Australian Capital Territory to forests and woodlands at 500–1,700 m (1,600–5,600 ft) altitude east of Melbourne and in the Grampians in Victoria.

== See also ==
- List of Acacia species
