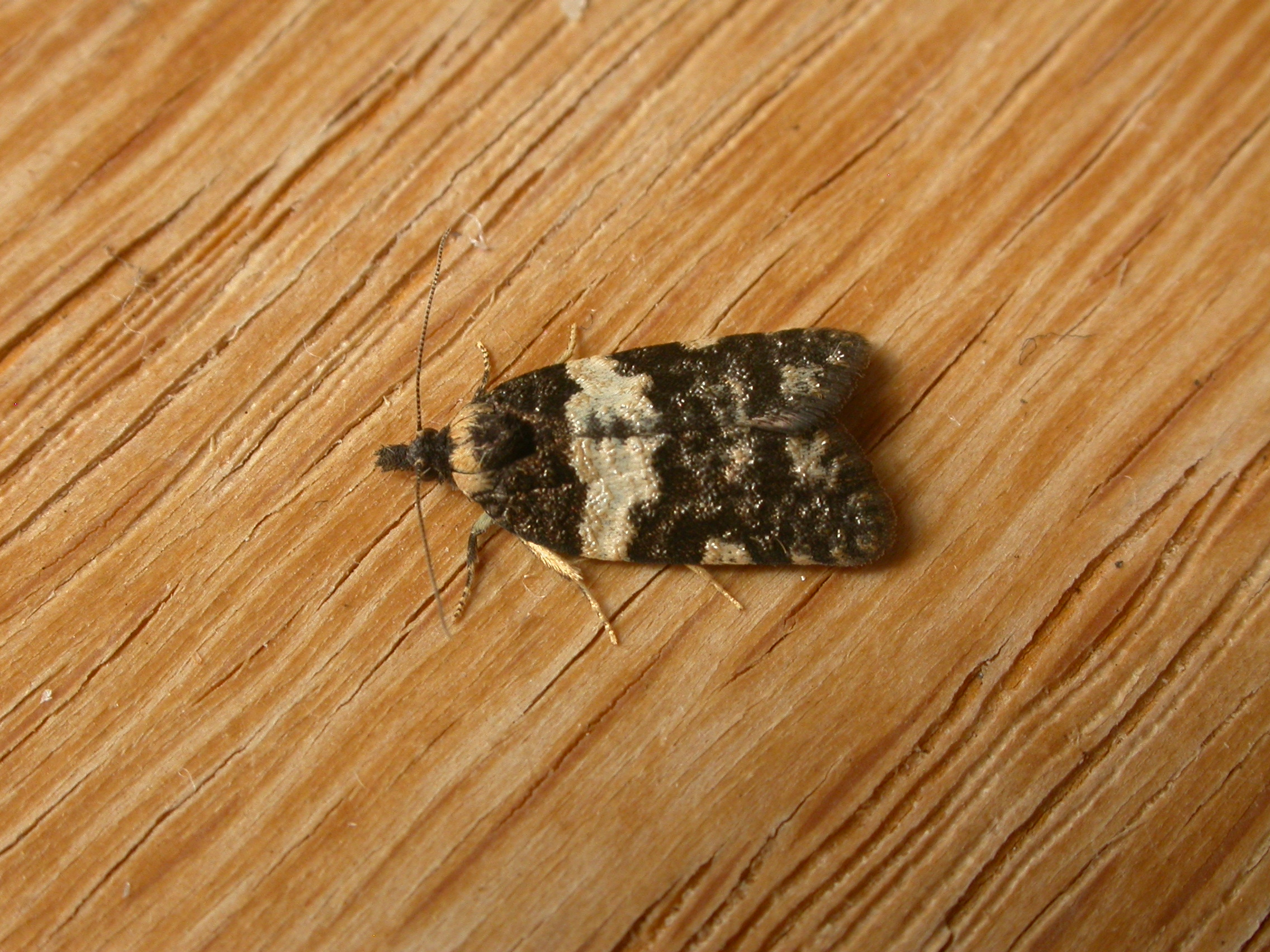

Scientific classification
- Domain: Eukaryota
- Kingdom: Animalia
- Phylum: Arthropoda
- Class: Insecta
- Order: Lepidoptera
- Family: Tortricidae
- Subfamily: Tortricinae
- Genus: Arotrophora; Meyrick, 1881

Species
- See text

Synonyms
- Arotrophoa Turner, 1945

= Arotrophora =

Genus of tortrix moths

Arotrophora is a genus of tortrix moth. They occur in Australia, where they are strongly associated with the plant family Proteaceae. All of the known Australian larvae bore in Banksia flower spikes. The genus was recently discovered from the Oriental region and one species is found on Papua.

== Taxonomy ==
The genus was first published by amateur entomologist Edward Meyrick.

It is currently placed in subfamily Tortricinae (although most entomologists now consider this an unnatural group), and sometimes in the tribe Cnephasiini, although it is quite different from Northern Hemisphere genera placed in that tribe.

It is closely related to genera including Peraglyphis and Syllomatia; together, these genera are sometimes referred to as the Arotrophora group.

== Species ==
The species of Arotrophora are:

- Arotrophora anemarcha (Lower, 1902)
- Arotrophora arcuatalis (Walker, 1865) (banksia boring moth)
- Arotrophora bernardmyo Razowski, 2009
- Arotrophora canthelias Meyrick, 1910
- Arotrophora charassapex Razowski, 2009
- Arotrophora charistis Meyrick, 1910
- Arotrophora charopa Razowski, 2009
- Arotrophora cherrapunji Razowski, 2009
- Arotrophora diadela Common, 1963
- Arotrophora ericirra Common, 1963
- Arotrophora euides Turner, 1927
- Arotrophora fijigena Razowski, 2009
- Arotrophora gilligani Razowski, 2009
- Arotrophora hongsona Razowski, 2009
- Arotrophora inthanona Razowski, 2009
- Arotrophora khasiasana Razowski, 2009
- Arotrophora khatana Razowski, 2009
- Arotrophora khunmaei Razowski, 2009
- Arotrophora kundasanga Razowski, 2009
- Arotrophora obrimsocia Razowski, 2009
- Arotrophora ochraceellus Walker, 1863
- Arotrophora paiana Razowski, 2009
- Arotrophora siniocosma Turner, 1926
- Arotrophora tubulosa Razowski, 2009
- Arotrophora utarana Razowski, 2009

== Former species ==
- Arotrophora crustata Meyrick, 1912
- Arotrophora semifulva (Meyrick, 1908)
