= Arotrophora gilligani =

Scientific classification
- Domain: Eukaryota
- Kingdom: Animalia
- Phylum: Arthropoda
- Class: Insecta
- Order: Lepidoptera
- Family: Tortricidae
- Genus: Arotrophora
- Species: A. gilligani

Binomial name
- Arotrophora gilligani Razowski, 2009

Species of moth

Arotrophora gilligani is a species of moth of the family Tortricidae. It is found in Taiwan.

The wingspan is about 16 mm.

== Etymology ==
The species is named for Todd Gilligan.
