= Arotrophora kundasanga =

Scientific classification
- Domain: Eukaryota
- Kingdom: Animalia
- Phylum: Arthropoda
- Class: Insecta
- Order: Lepidoptera
- Family: Tortricidae
- Genus: Arotrophora
- Species: A. kundasanga

Binomial name
- Arotrophora kundasanga Razowski, 2009

Species of moth

Arotrophora kundasanga is a species of moth of the family Tortricidae primarily found in Sabah on Borneo.

The wingspan is about 14 mm.

== Etymology ==
The species name refers to the Kundasang golf course, the type locality.
