= Arotrophora ericirra =

Scientific classification
- Domain: Eukaryota
- Kingdom: Animalia
- Phylum: Arthropoda
- Class: Insecta
- Order: Lepidoptera
- Family: Tortricidae
- Genus: Arotrophora
- Species: A. ericirra

Binomial name
- Arotrophora ericirra Common, 1963

Species of moth

Arotrophora ericirra is a species of moth of the family Tortricidae. It is found in Australia, where it has been recorded from New South Wales.

The wingspan is about 27 mm for males and 30.5 mm for females.
