= Sorolopha saitoi =

Scientific classification
- Kingdom: Animalia
- Phylum: Arthropoda
- Class: Insecta
- Order: Lepidoptera
- Family: Tortricidae
- Genus: Sorolopha
- Species: S. saitoi

Binomial name
- Sorolopha saitoi Kawabe, 1989

Species of moth

Sorolopha saitoi is a moth of the family Tortricidae. It is found in Thailand and Vietnam.
