= Sorolopha archimedias =

Scientific classification
- Kingdom: Animalia
- Phylum: Arthropoda
- Class: Insecta
- Order: Lepidoptera
- Family: Tortricidae
- Genus: Sorolopha
- Species: S. archimedias

Binomial name
- Sorolopha archimedias (Meyrick, 1912)

Synonyms
- Argyroploce archimedias Meyrick, 1912; Argyroploce purpurissatana Meyrick (nec Kennel), 1930; Olethreutes purpurissatana Clarke, 1958; Olethreutes archimedias Clarke, 1958; Eudemis archimedias Falkovitsh, 1962; Eudemis (Eudemis) archimedias Diakonoff, 1068; Eudemis oxygona Diakonoff, 1968; Sorolopha archimedias Diakonoff, 1973

Species of moth

Sorolopha archimedias is a moth of the family Tortricidae first described by Edward Meyrick in 1912. It is found in Thailand, China, Sri Lanka, India, Java and Queensland, Australia.

== Etymology ==
The name refers to the brown arch of scales on the back of the thorax and is derived from Latin archi (meaning arch) and medias (meaning middle).

== Biology ==
The larvae feed on Cinnamomum verum, Cinnamomum camphora, Syzygium aromaticum and Litsea glutinosa. They live in a silken web, spun between the leaves of the host plant.
