= Sorolopha delochlora =

Scientific classification
- Domain: Eukaryota
- Kingdom: Animalia
- Phylum: Arthropoda
- Class: Insecta
- Order: Lepidoptera
- Family: Tortricidae
- Genus: Sorolopha
- Species: S. delochlora

Binomial name
- Sorolopha delochlora (Turner, 1916)

Synonyms
- Alypeta delochlora Turner, 1916

Species of moth

Sorolopha delochlora is a species of moth of the family Tortricidae. It is found in Australia, where it has been recorded from Queensland.

The wingspan is about 18 mm. The forewings are deep green, partly suffused with bluish green. There is a fan-shaped crest of fuscous scales with green dorsal edge and a triangular blackish mark. The hindwings are dark fuscous, thinly scaled towards the base.
