= Sorolopha cervicata =

Scientific classification
- Domain: Eukaryota
- Kingdom: Animalia
- Phylum: Arthropoda
- Class: Insecta
- Order: Lepidoptera
- Family: Tortricidae
- Genus: Sorolopha
- Species: S. cervicata

Binomial name
- Sorolopha cervicata Diakonoff, 1973

Species of moth

Sorolopha cervicata is a moth of the family Tortricidae. It is found in Burma and Vietnam.

The wingspan is about 14 mm.
