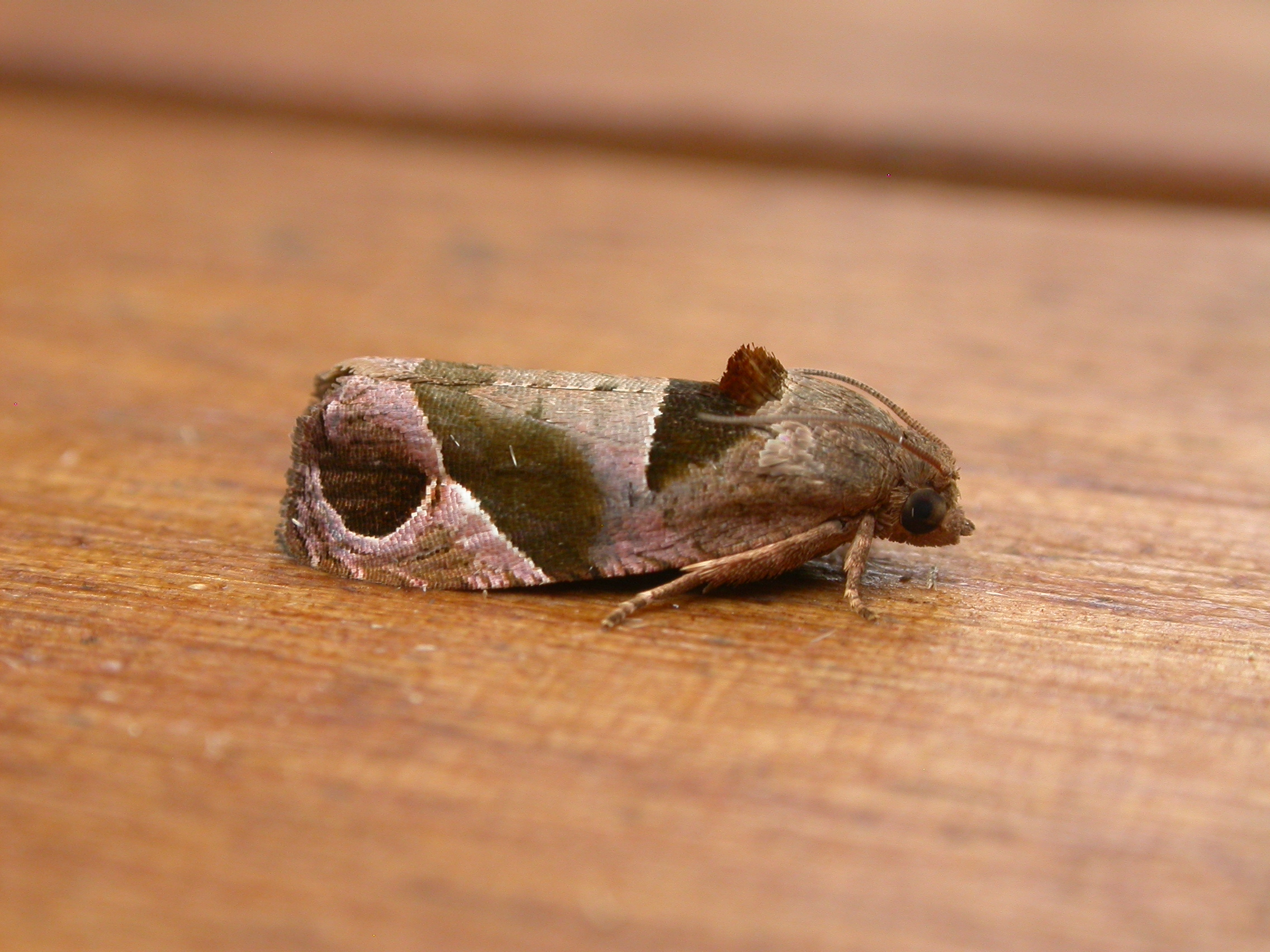
- Sorolopha cyclotoma

Scientific classification
- Kingdom: Animalia
- Phylum: Arthropoda
- Clade: Pancrustacea
- Class: Insecta
- Order: Lepidoptera
- Family: Tortricidae
- Tribe: Olethreutini
- Genus: Sorolopha; Lower, 1901

= Sorolopha =

Genus of tortrix moths

Sorolopha is a genus of moths belonging to the subfamily Olethreutinae of the family Tortricidae.

== Species ==
- Sorolopha aeolochlora (Meyrick, 1916)
- Sorolopha agalma Diakonoff, 1973
- Sorolopha agana (Falkovitsh, 1966)
- Sorolopha agathopis (Meyrick, 1927)
- Sorolopha archimedias (Meyrick, 1912)
- Sorolopha arctosceles (Meyrick, 1931)
- Sorolopha argyropa Diakonoff, 1973
- Sorolopha artocincta Diakonoff, 1973
- Sorolopha asphaeropa Diakonoff, 1973
- Sorolopha asymmetrana Kuznetzov, 2003
- Sorolopha atmochlora (Meyrick, 1930)
- Sorolopha auribasis Diakonoff, 1973
- Sorolopha authadis Diakonoff, 1973
- Sorolopha autoberylla (Meyrick, 1932)
- Sorolopha baribaris (Sakagami, 2023)
- Sorolopha bathysema Diakonoff, 1973
- Sorolopha bruneiregalis Tuck & Robinson, 1993
- Sorolopha brunnorbis Razowski, 2009
- Sorolopha bryana (Felder & Rogenhofer, 1875)
- Sorolopha callichlora (Meyrick, 1909)
- Sorolopha camarotis (Meyrick, 1936)
- Sorolopha caryochlora Diakonoff, 1973
- Sorolopha cervicata Diakonoff, 1973
- Sorolopha chiangmaiensis Kawabe, 1989
- Sorolopha chlorotica Liu & Bai, 1985
- Sorolopha chortodes (Diakonoff, 1968)
- Sorolopha compsitis (Meyrick, 1912)
- Sorolopha cyclotoma Lower, 1901
- Sorolopha delochlora (Turner, 1916)
- Sorolopha dictyonophora Diakonoff, 1973
- Sorolopha dorsichlora Razowski, 2009
- Sorolopha doryphora Diakonoff, 1973
- Sorolopha dyspeista Diakonoff, 1973
- Sorolopha elaeodes (Lower, 1908)
- Sorolopha englyptopa (Meyrick, 1938)
- Sorolopha epichares Diakonoff, 1973
- Sorolopha euochropa Diakonoff, 1973
- Sorolopha eurychlora Diakonoff, 1973
- Sorolopha ferruginosa Kawabe, 1989
- Sorolopha ghilarovi Kuznetzov, 1988
- Sorolopha herbifera (Meyrick, 1909)
- Sorolopha homalopa (Diakonoff, 1968)
- Sorolopha hydrargyra (Meyrick, 1931)
- Sorolopha irirectangulata (Hu & Yu, 2026)
- Sorolopha johngreeni Horak, 2006
- Sorolopha karsholti Kawabe, 1989
- Sorolopha khaoyaiensis Kawabe, 1989
- Sorolopha leptochlora (Turner, 1916)
- Sorolopha liochlora (Meyrick, 1914)
- Sorolopha longurus Liu & Bai, 1982
- Sorolopha margaritopa (Dianokoff, 1953)
- Sorolopha melanocycla Diakonoff, 1973
- Sorolopha metastena Diakonoff, 1973
- Sorolopha micheliacola Liu, 2001
- Sorolopha mniochlora (Meyrick, 1907)
- Sorolopha muscida (Wileman & Stringer, 1929)
- Sorolopha nagaii Kawabe, 1989
- Sorolopha nucleata Diakonoff, 1973
- Sorolopha phyllochlora (Meyrick, 1905)
- Sorolopha plinthograpta (Meyrick, 1931)
- Sorolopha plumboviridis Diakonoff, 1973
- Sorolopha prasinias (Meyrick, 1916)
- Sorolopha rubescens Diakonoff, 1973
- Sorolopha saitoi Kawabe, 1989
- Sorolopha semiculta (Meyrick, 1909)
- Sorolopha semifulva (Meyrick, 1908)
- Sorolopha specialis (Hu & Yu, 2026)
- Sorolopha sphaerocopa (Meyrick, in de Joannis, 1930)
- Sorolopha stygiaula (Meyrick, 1933)
- Sorolopha suthepensis (Patibhakyothin & Pinkaew, 2015)
- Sorolopha tenuirurus Liu & Bai, 1982
- Sorolopha timiochlora Diakonoff, 1973

== See also ==
- List of Tortricidae genera
