= Arotrophora euides =

Scientific classification
- Domain: Eukaryota
- Kingdom: Animalia
- Phylum: Arthropoda
- Class: Insecta
- Order: Lepidoptera
- Family: Tortricidae
- Genus: Arotrophora
- Species: A. euides

Binomial name
- Arotrophora euides (Turner, 1927)

Synonyms
- Tortrix euides Turner, 1927

Species of moth

Arotrophora euides is a species of moth of the family Tortricidae. It is found in Australia, where it has been recorded from Tasmania. The habitat consists of subalpine open woodland at altitudes between 860 and 950 meters.

The wingspan is about 23 mm.

The larvae feed on Lomatia polymorpha. They tie the leaves of their host plant.
