= Sorolopha brunnorbis =

Scientific classification
- Kingdom: Animalia
- Phylum: Arthropoda
- Class: Insecta
- Order: Lepidoptera
- Family: Tortricidae
- Genus: Sorolopha
- Species: S. brunnorbis

Binomial name
- Sorolopha brunnorbis Razowski, 2009

Species of moth

Sorolopha brunnorbis is a moth of the family Tortricidae. It is found in Burma and Vietnam.

The wingspan is about 19 mm.
