= Sorolopha ghilarovi =

Scientific classification
- Domain: Eukaryota
- Kingdom: Animalia
- Phylum: Arthropoda
- Class: Insecta
- Order: Lepidoptera
- Family: Tortricidae
- Genus: Sorolopha
- Species: S. ghilarovi

Binomial name
- Sorolopha ghilarovi Kuznetzov, 1988

Species of moth

Sorolopha ghilarovi is a moth of the family Tortricidae. It is found in Vietnam.
