= Arotrophora ochraceellus =

Scientific classification
- Kingdom: Animalia
- Phylum: Arthropoda
- Class: Insecta
- Order: Lepidoptera
- Family: Tortricidae
- Genus: Arotrophora
- Species: A. ochraceellus

Binomial name
- Arotrophora ochraceellus (Walker, 1863)

Synonyms
- Crambus ochraceellus Walker, 1863

Species of moth

Arotrophora ochraceellus is a species of moth of the family Tortricidae. It is found in Australia, where it has been recorded from New South Wales and Victoria.

The wingspan is about 28 mm for males and 32 mm for females.
