= Sorolopha stygiaula =

Scientific classification
- Kingdom: Animalia
- Phylum: Arthropoda
- Class: Insecta
- Order: Lepidoptera
- Family: Tortricidae
- Genus: Sorolopha
- Species: S. stygiaula

Binomial name
- Sorolopha stygiaula (Meyrick, 1933)

Synonyms
- Argyroploce stygiaula Meyrick, 1933

Species of moth

Sorolopha stygiaula is a moth of the family Tortricidae. It is found in Thailand and Java.

The wingspan is about 17 mm.
