= Arotrophora charassapex =

Scientific classification
- Domain: Eukaryota
- Kingdom: Animalia
- Phylum: Arthropoda
- Class: Insecta
- Order: Lepidoptera
- Family: Tortricidae
- Genus: Arotrophora
- Species: A. charassapex

Binomial name
- Arotrophora charassapex Razowski, 2009

Species of moth

Arotrophora charassapex is a species of moth of the family Tortricidae. It is found in Thailand.

The wingspan is about 14 mm.

== Etymology ==
The species name refers to the shape of the apex and is derived from Greek charasso (meaning I am sharpening).
