= Arotrophora diadela =

Scientific classification
- Domain: Eukaryota
- Kingdom: Animalia
- Phylum: Arthropoda
- Class: Insecta
- Order: Lepidoptera
- Family: Tortricidae
- Genus: Arotrophora
- Species: A. diadela

Binomial name
- Arotrophora diadela Common, 1963

Species of moth

Arotrophora diadela is a species of moth of the family Tortricidae. It is found in Australia, where it has been recorded from Western Australia.

The wingspan is about 22.5 mm.
