= Arotrophora canthelias =

Scientific classification
- Kingdom: Animalia
- Phylum: Arthropoda
- Class: Insecta
- Order: Lepidoptera
- Family: Tortricidae
- Genus: Arotrophora
- Species: A. canthelias

Binomial name
- Arotrophora canthelias Meyrick, 1910

Synonyms
- Arotrophora salebrata Meyrick, 1910

Species of moth

Arotrophora canthelias is a species of moth of the family Tortricidae. It is found in Australia, where it has been recorded from New South Wales and Victoria.

The wingspan is about 16.5 mm for males and 20 mm for females.

The larvae have been recorded feeding on Banksia spinulosa.
