= Arotrophora anemarcha =

Scientific classification
- Domain: Eukaryota
- Kingdom: Animalia
- Phylum: Arthropoda
- Class: Insecta
- Order: Lepidoptera
- Family: Tortricidae
- Genus: Arotrophora
- Species: A. anemarcha

Binomial name
- Arotrophora anemarcha (Lower, 1902)

Synonyms
- Tortrix anemarcha Lower, 1902

Species of moth

Arotrophora anemarcha is a species of moth of the family Tortricidae first described by Oswald Bertram Lower in 1902. It is found in Australia, where it has been recorded from New South Wales, South Australia and Tasmania. The habitat consists of heathland and open forests at altitudes up to 200 meters.

The wingspan is about 25 mm.

The larvae feed on Banksia marginata.
