= Arotrophora khasiasana =

Scientific classification
- Domain: Eukaryota
- Kingdom: Animalia
- Phylum: Arthropoda
- Class: Insecta
- Order: Lepidoptera
- Family: Tortricidae
- Genus: Arotrophora
- Species: A. khasiasana

Binomial name
- Arotrophora khasiasana Razowski, 2009

Species of moth

Arotrophora khasiasana is a species of moth of the family Tortricidae. It is found in India, where it has been recorded from the Khasi Hills.

The wingspan is about 15 mm.

== Etymology ==
The species name refers to Khasi Hills, the type locality.
