= Arotrophora tubulosa =

Scientific classification
- Domain: Eukaryota
- Kingdom: Animalia
- Phylum: Arthropoda
- Class: Insecta
- Order: Lepidoptera
- Family: Tortricidae
- Genus: Arotrophora
- Species: A. tubulosa

Binomial name
- Arotrophora tubulosa Razowski, 2009

Species of moth

Arotrophora tubulosa is a species of moth of the family Tortricidae. It is found on Fiji in the South Pacific Ocean.

The wingspan is about 21 mm.

== Etymology ==
The species name refers to the shape of the antrum and is derived from Latin tubulus (meaning small tube).
