= Arotrophora arcuatalis =

Scientific classification
- Domain: Eukaryota
- Kingdom: Animalia
- Phylum: Arthropoda
- Class: Insecta
- Order: Lepidoptera
- Family: Tortricidae
- Genus: Arotrophora
- Species: A. arcuatalis

Binomial name
- Arotrophora arcuatalis (Walker, 1865)

Synonyms
- Scopula arcuatalis Walker, 1865; Crambus submarginellus Walker, 1866; Eromene transcissella Walker, 1866

Species of moth

Arotrophora arcuatalis, commonly known as banksia boring moth or rarely banksia moth, is a species of Australian tortrid moth best known as a pest of Banksia.

First described by Francis Walker in 1865, it is the type species for Arotrophora. It occurs throughout coastal and sub-coastal areas of southern Australia. Adults are grey with brown and white markings.

The moth lays its eggs on the surface of the flower spikes of Banksia while in early bud, and the larvae tunnel into the axis of the spike, boring from follicle to follicle to consume the seeds. They infest a wide range of Banksia species, in some species substantially reducing the seed set. In the cut flower industry, their tunnelling affects the cosmetic qualities of flower spikes, rendering them unsaleable. As a result, there has been significant research into control of the moth, including identification of its pheromones.
