= Sorolopha nagaii =

Scientific classification
- Kingdom: Animalia
- Phylum: Arthropoda
- Class: Insecta
- Order: Lepidoptera
- Family: Tortricidae
- Genus: Sorolopha
- Species: S. nagaii

Binomial name
- Sorolopha nagaii Kawabe, 1989

Species of moth

Sorolopha nagaii is a moth of the family Tortricidae. It is found in Thailand.
