= Arotrophora inthanona =

Scientific classification
- Domain: Eukaryota
- Kingdom: Animalia
- Phylum: Arthropoda
- Class: Insecta
- Order: Lepidoptera
- Family: Tortricidae
- Genus: Arotrophora
- Species: A. inthanona

Binomial name
- Arotrophora inthanona Razowski, 2009

Species of moth

Arotrophora inthanona is a species of moth of the family Tortricidae. It is found in Thailand.

The wingspan is about 26 mm.

== Etymology ==
The species name refers to Doi Inthanon, the type locality.
