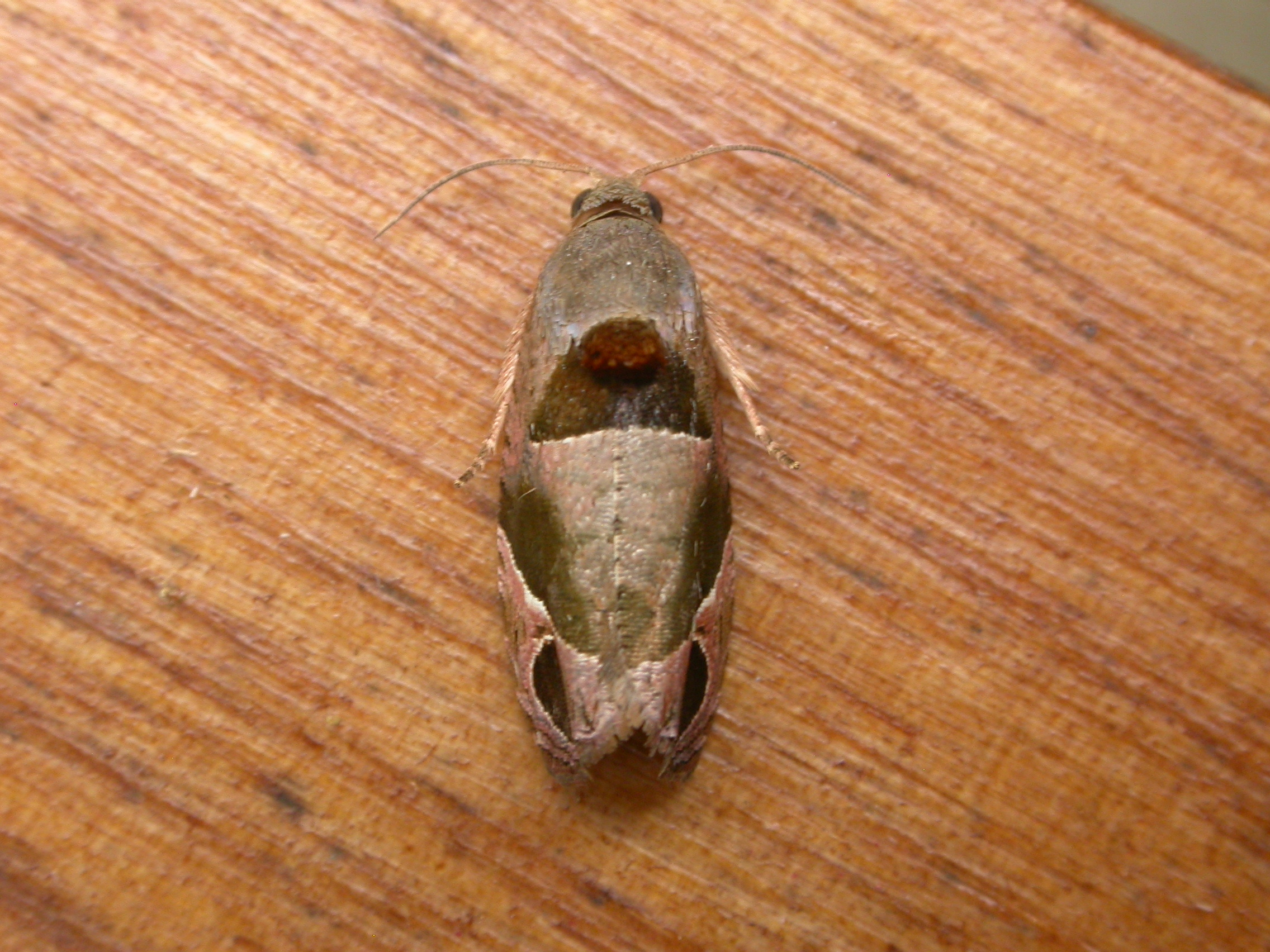

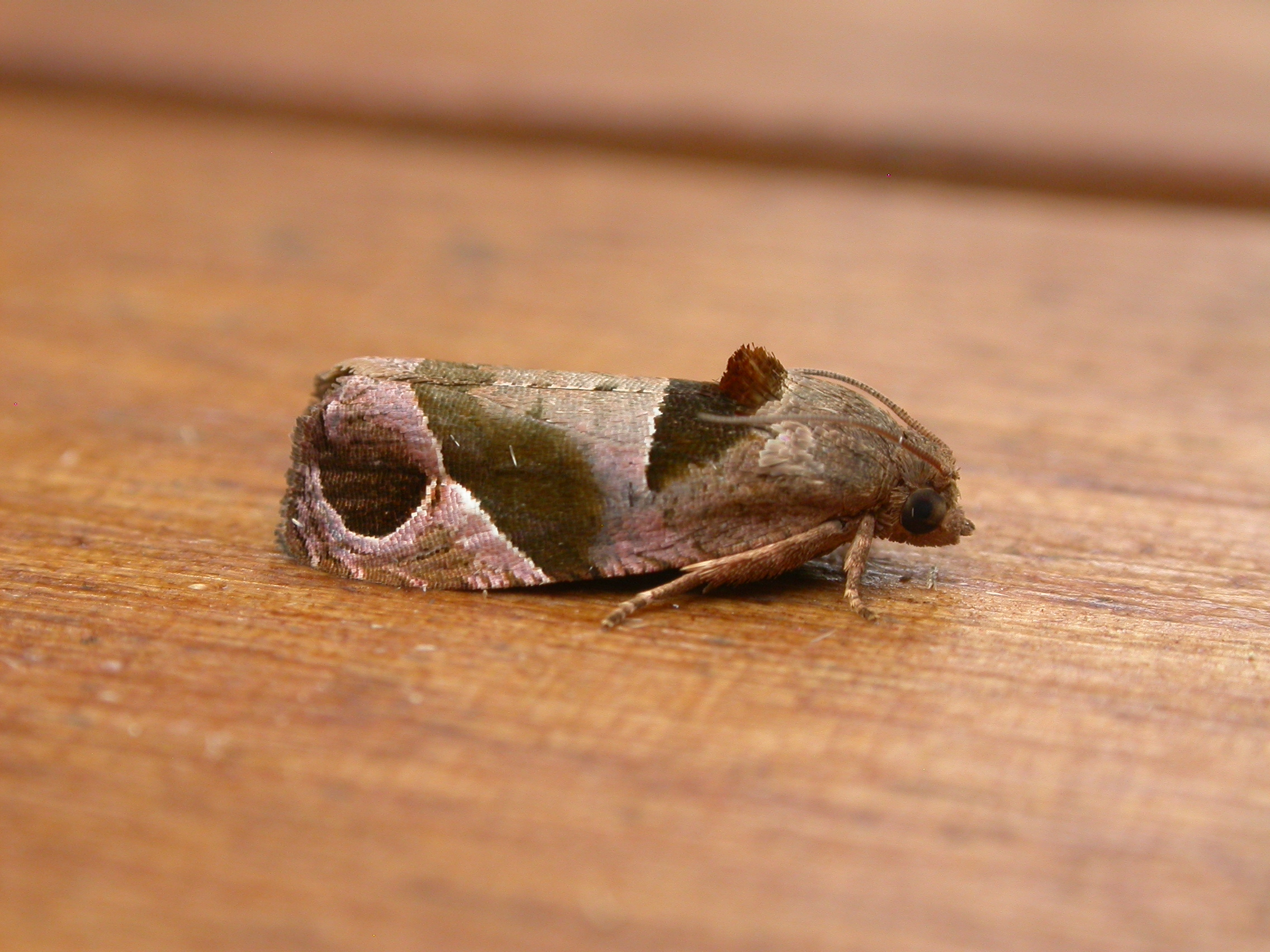

Scientific classification
- Kingdom: Animalia
- Phylum: Arthropoda
- Class: Insecta
- Order: Lepidoptera
- Family: Tortricidae
- Genus: Sorolopha
- Species: S. cyclotoma

Binomial name
- Sorolopha cyclotoma Lower, 1901

= Sorolopha cyclotoma =

Species of moth

Sorolopha cyclotoma is a species of moth of the family Tortricidae. It is found in New Caledonia, New Guinea and Australia (the Northern Territory and Queensland). The habitat consists of rainforests.
