= Sorolopha liochlora =

Scientific classification
- Kingdom: Animalia
- Phylum: Arthropoda
- Class: Insecta
- Order: Lepidoptera
- Family: Tortricidae
- Genus: Sorolopha
- Species: S. liochlora

Binomial name
- Sorolopha liochlora (Meyrick, 1914)

Synonyms
- Argyroploce liochlora Meyrick, 1914

Species of moth

Sorolopha liochlora is a moth of the family Tortricidae. It is found in Sumatra and Taiwan.
