= Arotrophora utarana =

Scientific classification
- Domain: Eukaryota
- Kingdom: Animalia
- Phylum: Arthropoda
- Class: Insecta
- Order: Lepidoptera
- Family: Tortricidae
- Genus: Arotrophora
- Species: A. utarana

Binomial name
- Arotrophora utarana Razowski, 2009

Species of moth

Arotrophora utarana is a species of moth of the family Tortricidae. It is found on Sulawesi in Indonesia.

The wingspan is about 18.5 mm.
