= Sorolopha phyllochlora =

Scientific classification
- Kingdom: Animalia
- Phylum: Arthropoda
- Class: Insecta
- Order: Lepidoptera
- Family: Tortricidae
- Genus: Sorolopha
- Species: S. phyllochlora

Binomial name
- Sorolopha phyllochlora (Meyrick, 1905)

Synonyms
- Argyroploce phyllochlora Meyrick, 1905; Argyroploce ptilosema Meyrick, 1916

Species of moth

Sorolopha phyllochlora is a moth of the family Tortricidae first described by Edward Meyrick in 1905. It is found in Sri Lanka.
