= Arotrophora siniocosma =

Scientific classification
- Domain: Eukaryota
- Kingdom: Animalia
- Phylum: Arthropoda
- Class: Insecta
- Order: Lepidoptera
- Family: Tortricidae
- Genus: Arotrophora
- Species: A. siniocosma

Binomial name
- Arotrophora siniocosma Turner, 1926

Species of moth

Arotrophora siniocosma is a species of moth of the family Tortricidae. It is found in Australia, where it has been recorded from Queensland, New South Wales and Tasmania. The habitat consists of coastal heathland.

The wingspan is about 24 mm.

The larvae feed on Banksia marginata.
