= Sorolopha sphaerocopa =

Scientific classification
- Kingdom: Animalia
- Phylum: Arthropoda
- Clade: Pancrustacea
- Class: Insecta
- Order: Lepidoptera
- Family: Tortricidae
- Genus: Sorolopha
- Species: S. sphaerocopa

Binomial name
- Sorolopha sphaerocopa (Meyrick, 1931)

Synonyms
- Argyroploce sphaerocopa Meyrick, 1931

Species of moth

Sorolopha sphaerocopa is a moth of the family Tortricidae. It is found in India, Thailand, Japan, China, Sumatra, western Java, the Moluccas and Vietnam.

The wingspan is 15–16 mm for males and 16–17 mm for females.
