= Sorolopha leptochlora =

Scientific classification
- Domain: Eukaryota
- Kingdom: Animalia
- Phylum: Arthropoda
- Class: Insecta
- Order: Lepidoptera
- Family: Tortricidae
- Genus: Sorolopha
- Species: S. leptochlora

Binomial name
- Sorolopha leptochlora (Turner, 1916)

Synonyms
- Alypeta leptochlora Turner, 1916

Species of moth

Sorolopha leptochlora is a species of moth of the family Tortricidae. It is found in Australia, where it has been recorded from Queensland.

The wingspan is about 12 mm. The forewings are fuscous with a small crest of scales on the dorsum with a green costal edge, strigulated (finely streaked) with fuscous. The apical portion of the wing is whitish, with greenish and fuscous scales. The hindwings are fuscous, thinly scaled towards the base.
