= Sorolopha herbifera =

Scientific classification
- Kingdom: Animalia
- Phylum: Arthropoda
- Class: Insecta
- Order: Lepidoptera
- Family: Tortricidae
- Genus: Sorolopha
- Species: S. herbifera

Binomial name
- Sorolopha herbifera (Meyrick, 1909)

Synonyms
- Argyroploce herbifera Meyrick, 1909

Species of moth

Sorolopha herbifera is a moth of the family Tortricidae. It is found in Vietnam, India, Sri Lanka, Sumatra, Java and Taiwan.

The larvae feed on Cinnamomum camphora.
