= Sorolopha plinthograpta =

Scientific classification
- Kingdom: Animalia
- Phylum: Arthropoda
- Class: Insecta
- Order: Lepidoptera
- Family: Tortricidae
- Genus: Sorolopha
- Species: S. plinthograpta

Binomial name
- Sorolopha plinthograpta (Meyrick, 1931)

Synonyms
- Argyroploce plinthograpta Meyrick, 1931

Species of moth

Sorolopha plinthograpta is a moth of the family Tortricidae. It is found in Thailand, Korea, Japan, Taiwan and eastern Java.

The wingspan is 17–19 mm.
