= Sorolopha bryana =

Scientific classification
- Domain: Eukaryota
- Kingdom: Animalia
- Phylum: Arthropoda
- Class: Insecta
- Order: Lepidoptera
- Family: Tortricidae
- Genus: Sorolopha
- Species: S. bryana

Binomial name
- Sorolopha bryana (C. Felder, R. Felder & Rogenhofer, 1875)

Synonyms
- Penthina bryana Felder & Rogenhofer, 1874; Sorolopha bryana Diakonoff, 1973

Species of moth

Sorolopha bryana is a moth of the family Tortricidae. The species was first described by Cajetan Felder, Rudolf Felder and Alois Friedrich Rogenhofer in 1875. It is found in Sri Lanka.
