= Sorolopha specialis =

- Male
- Underside of male

Scientific classification
- Kingdom: Animalia
- Phylum: Arthropoda
- Clade: Pancrustacea
- Class: Insecta
- Order: Lepidoptera
- Family: Tortricidae
- Genus: Sorolopha
- Species: S. specialis

Binomial name
- Sorolopha specialis Hu & Yu, 2026

Species of moth

Sorolopha specialis is a species of moth in the family Tortricidae. It was first described by Zhurong Hu and Haili Yu in a 2026 paper.

== Description ==
The antennae extend to the middle of the forewing. The forewing is pale brown and green with black lines along the center, and ranges in length from 6.0 to 7.5 millimeters. The hindwing is pale brown, except for a small white portion where it overlaps with the forewing. Males of the species have an oval-shaped patch of black androconical scales on the lower part of the hindwing, which distinguish S. specialis from other members of its genus.

== Etymology ==
The species name specialis derives from the Latin word specialis, meaning "unique", referring to the androconical scales that distinguish the species from other members of its genus.

== Distribution ==
The holotype was collected at a forest farm in Pingxiang, Guangxi Zhuang Autonomous Region, China. Paratypes were also collected from Hainan Province.
