= Sorolopha semiculta =

Scientific classification
- Kingdom: Animalia
- Phylum: Arthropoda
- Class: Insecta
- Order: Lepidoptera
- Family: Tortricidae
- Genus: Sorolopha
- Species: S. semiculta

Binomial name
- Sorolopha semiculta (Meyrick, 1909)

Synonyms
- Argyroploce semiculta Meyrick, 1909; Argyroploce heteraspis Meyrick, 1936

Species of moth

Sorolopha semiculta is a moth of the family Tortricidae. It is found in Thailand, Taiwan, India, Sri Lanka and the Solomon Islands.

Adults are brownish grey.
