= Arotrophora obrimsocia =

Scientific classification
- Domain: Eukaryota
- Kingdom: Animalia
- Phylum: Arthropoda
- Class: Insecta
- Order: Lepidoptera
- Family: Tortricidae
- Genus: Arotrophora
- Species: A. obrimsocia

Binomial name
- Arotrophora obrimsocia Razowski, 2009

Species of moth

Arotrophora obrimsocia is a species of moth of the family Tortricidae. It is found in Thailand and Assam, India.

The wingspan is 21–22 mm for males and 22–26 mm for females.
