= Arotrophora fijigena =

Scientific classification
- Kingdom: Animalia
- Phylum: Arthropoda
- Class: Insecta
- Order: Lepidoptera
- Family: Tortricidae
- Genus: Arotrophora
- Species: A. fijigena

Binomial name
- Arotrophora fijigena Razowski, 2009

Species of moth

Arotrophora fijigena is a species of moth of the family Tortricidae. It is found on Fiji in the South Pacific Ocean.

The wingspan is about 15 mm.
