= Arotrophora charistis =

Scientific classification
- Kingdom: Animalia
- Phylum: Arthropoda
- Class: Insecta
- Order: Lepidoptera
- Family: Tortricidae
- Genus: Arotrophora
- Species: A. charistis

Binomial name
- Arotrophora charistis Meyrick, 1910

Species of moth

Arotrophora charistis is a species of moth of the family Tortricidae. It is found in Australia, where it has been recorded from Queensland.

The wingspan is about 13.5 mm.
