= Arotrophora hongsona =

Scientific classification
- Domain: Eukaryota
- Kingdom: Animalia
- Phylum: Arthropoda
- Class: Insecta
- Order: Lepidoptera
- Family: Tortricidae
- Genus: Arotrophora
- Species: A. hongsona

Binomial name
- Arotrophora hongsona Razowski, 2009

Species of moth

Arotrophora hongsona is a species of moth of the family Tortricidae. It is found in Thailand.

The wingspan is about 14 mm.

== Etymology ==
The species name refers to Mae Hong Son, Pai District, the type locality.
