= Sorolopha dorsichlora =

Scientific classification
- Domain: Eukaryota
- Kingdom: Animalia
- Phylum: Arthropoda
- Class: Insecta
- Order: Lepidoptera
- Family: Tortricidae
- Genus: Sorolopha
- Species: S. dorsichlora

Binomial name
- Sorolopha dorsichlora Razowski, 2009

Species of moth

Sorolopha dorsichlora is a moth of the family Tortricidae. It is found in Burma and Vietnam.
