= Sorolopha chiangmaiensis =

Scientific classification
- Kingdom: Animalia
- Phylum: Arthropoda
- Class: Insecta
- Order: Lepidoptera
- Family: Tortricidae
- Genus: Sorolopha
- Species: S. chiangmaiensis

Binomial name
- Sorolopha chiangmaiensis Kawabe, 1989

Species of moth

Sorolopha chiangmaiensis is a moth of the family Tortricidae. It is found in Thailand and Vietnam.
