= Peraglyphis crustata =

Scientific classification
- Kingdom: Animalia
- Phylum: Arthropoda
- Clade: Pancrustacea
- Class: Insecta
- Order: Lepidoptera
- Family: Tortricidae
- Genus: Peraglyphis
- Species: P. crustata

Binomial name
- Peraglyphis crustata (Meyrick, 1912)

Synonyms
- Arotrophora crustata Meyrick, 1912

Species of moth

Peraglyphis crustata is a species of moth of the family Tortricidae. It is found in Assam, India.
