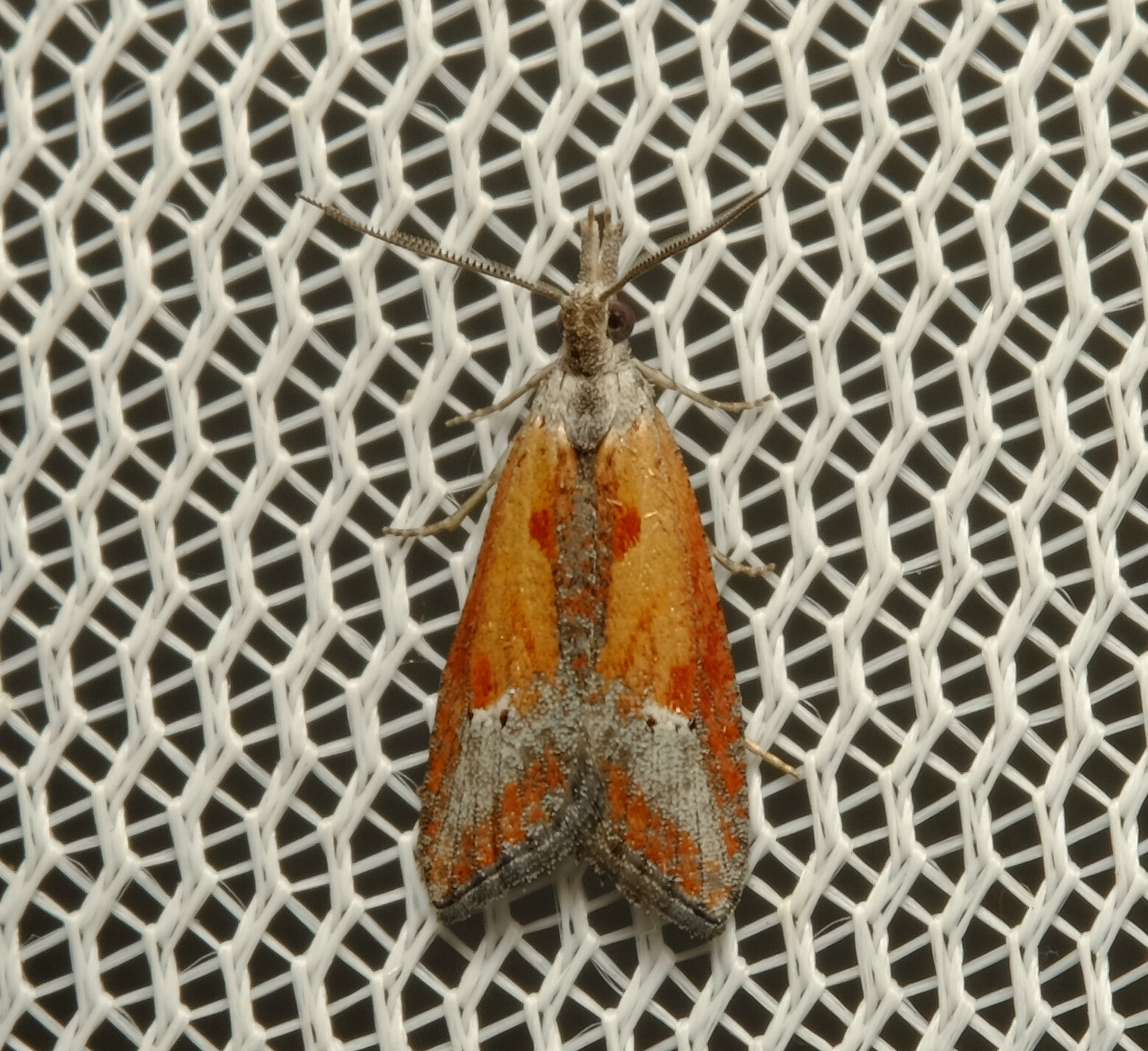
- Peraglyphis lividana

Scientific classification
- Kingdom: Animalia
- Phylum: Arthropoda
- Clade: Pancrustacea
- Class: Insecta
- Order: Lepidoptera
- Family: Tortricidae
- Subfamily: Tortricinae
- Genus: Peraglyphis; Common, 1963

= Peraglyphis =

Genus of tortrix moths

Peraglyphis is a genus of moths belonging to the subfamily Tortricinae of the family Tortricidae.

== Species ==
- Peraglyphis aderces Common, 1963
- Peraglyphis anaptis (Meyrick, 1910)
- Peraglyphis aphanta Common, 1963
- Peraglyphis atherista Common, 1963
- Peraglyphis atimana (Meyrick, 1881)
- Peraglyphis chalepa Common, 1963
- Peraglyphis confusana (Walker, 1863)
- Peraglyphis crustata (Meyrick, 1912)
- Peraglyphis dyscheres Common, 1963
- Peraglyphis epixantha Common, 1963
- Peraglyphis eucrines Common, 1963
- Peraglyphis hemerana (Meyrick, 1882)
- Peraglyphis idiogenes Common, 1963
- Peraglyphis lividana (Meyrick, 1881)
- Peraglyphis scepasta Common, 1963
- Peraglyphis silvana Razowski, 2012

== See also ==
- List of Tortricidae genera
