= Sorolopha semifulva =

Scientific classification
- Kingdom: Animalia
- Phylum: Arthropoda
- Class: Insecta
- Order: Lepidoptera
- Family: Tortricidae
- Genus: Sorolopha
- Species: S. semifulva

Binomial name
- Sorolopha semifulva (Meyrick, 1908)

Synonyms
- Schoenotenes semifulva Meyrick, 1908; Arotrophora semifulva; Tortrix semifulva

Species of moth

Sorolopha semifulva is a species of moth of the family Tortricidae. It is found in India (Assam) and western Malaysia and possibly the Philippines (Negros).
