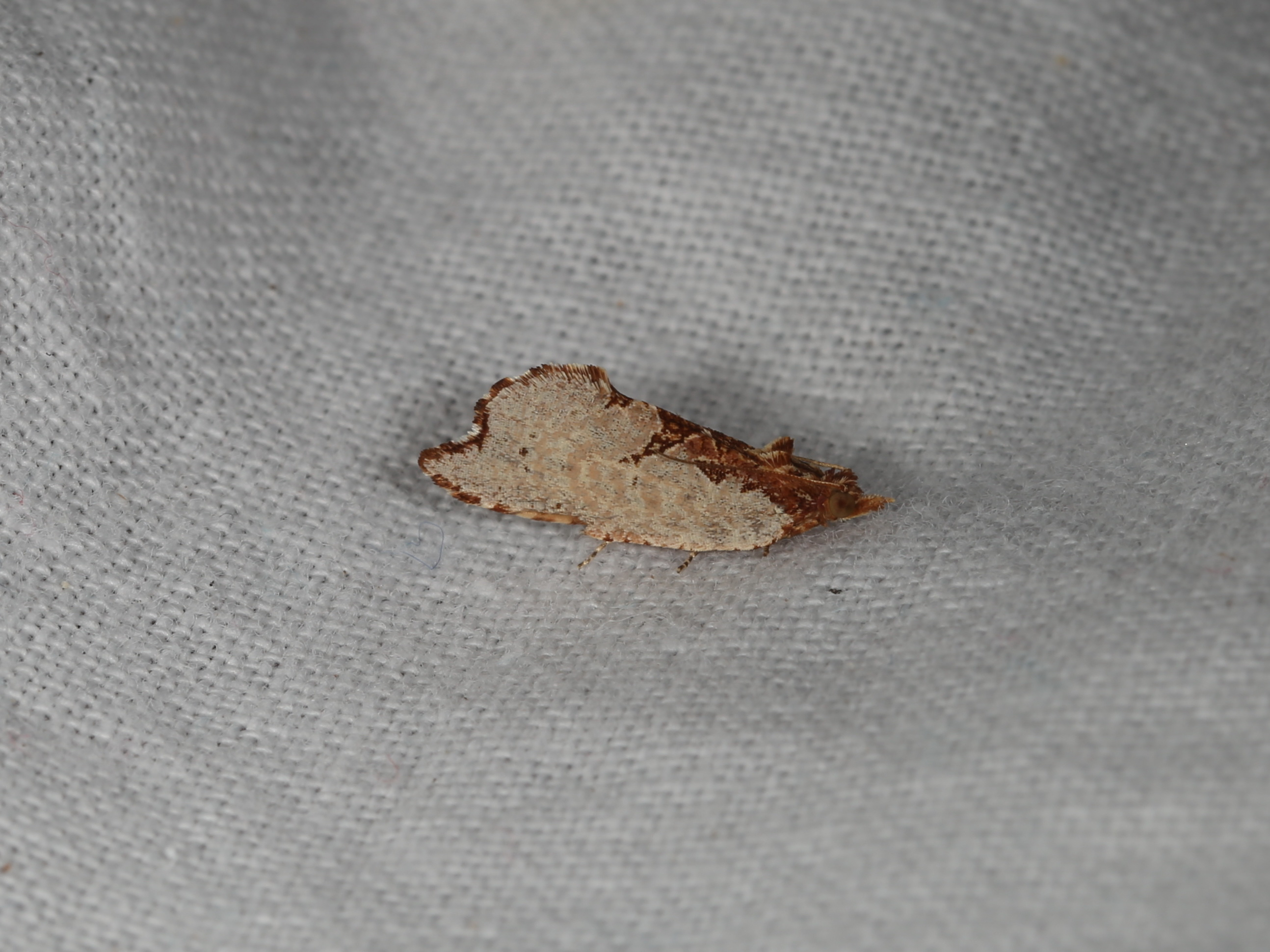

Scientific classification
- Domain: Eukaryota
- Kingdom: Animalia
- Phylum: Arthropoda
- Class: Insecta
- Order: Lepidoptera
- Family: Tortricidae
- Genus: Glyphidoptera
- Species: G. polymita

Binomial name
- Glyphidoptera polymita Turner, 1916

= Glyphidoptera polymita =

Species of moth

Glyphidoptera polymita is a species of moth of the family Tortricidae. It is found in Australia, where it has been recorded from New South Wales.

The wingspan is about 22 mm. The forewings are whitish, suffused and streaked with reddish brown. The hindwings are grey whitish.
