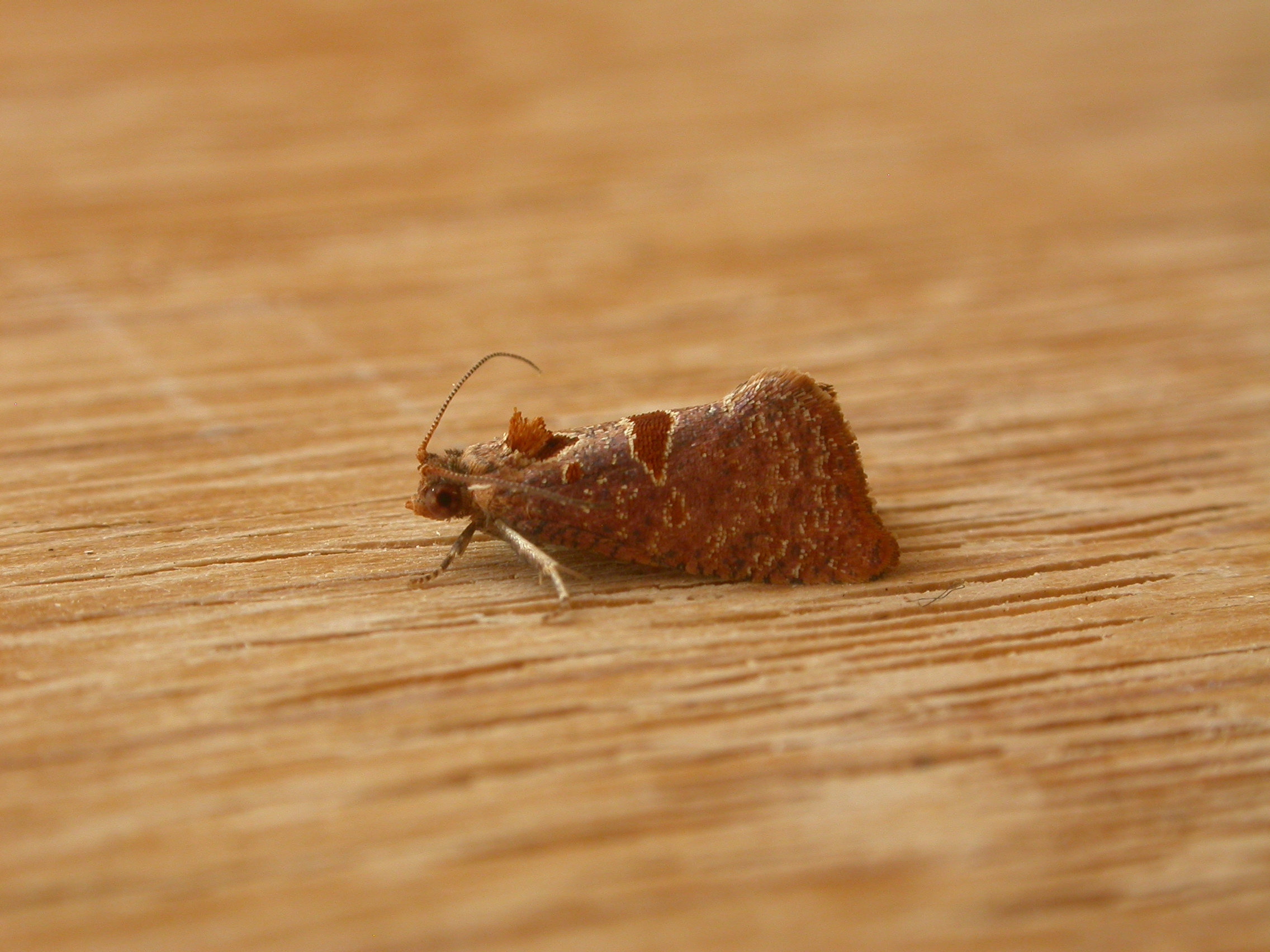
- Glyphidoptera insignana

Scientific classification
- Kingdom: Animalia
- Phylum: Arthropoda
- Class: Insecta
- Order: Lepidoptera
- Family: Tortricidae
- Tribe: Archipini
- Genus: Glyphidoptera; Turner, 1916

= Glyphidoptera =

Genus of tortrix moths

Glyphidoptera is a genus of moths belonging to the subfamily Tortricinae of the family Tortricidae.

== Species ==
- Glyphidoptera insignana (Meyrick, 1881)
- Glyphidoptera polymita Turner, 1916

== See also ==
- List of Tortricidae genera
