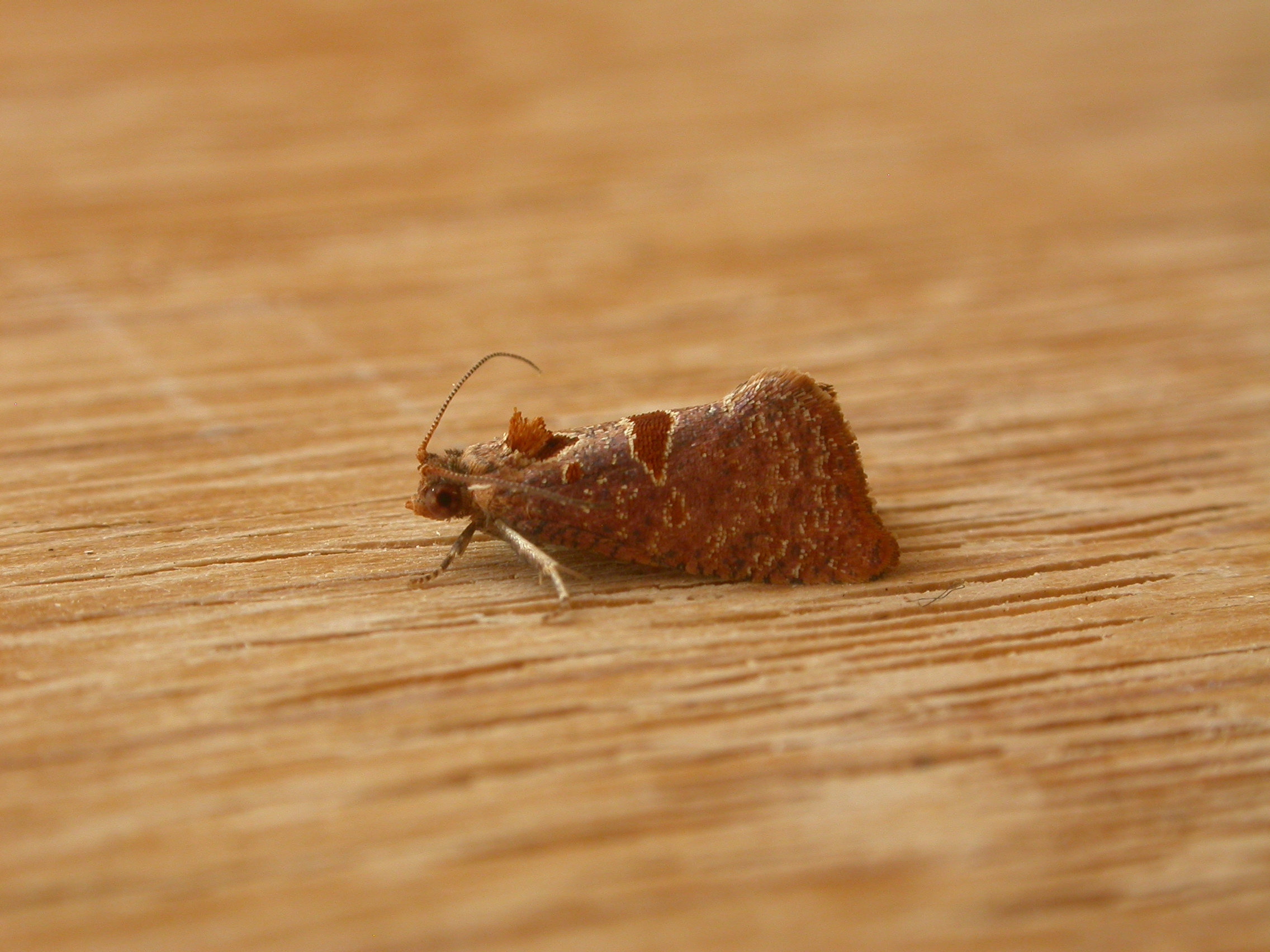

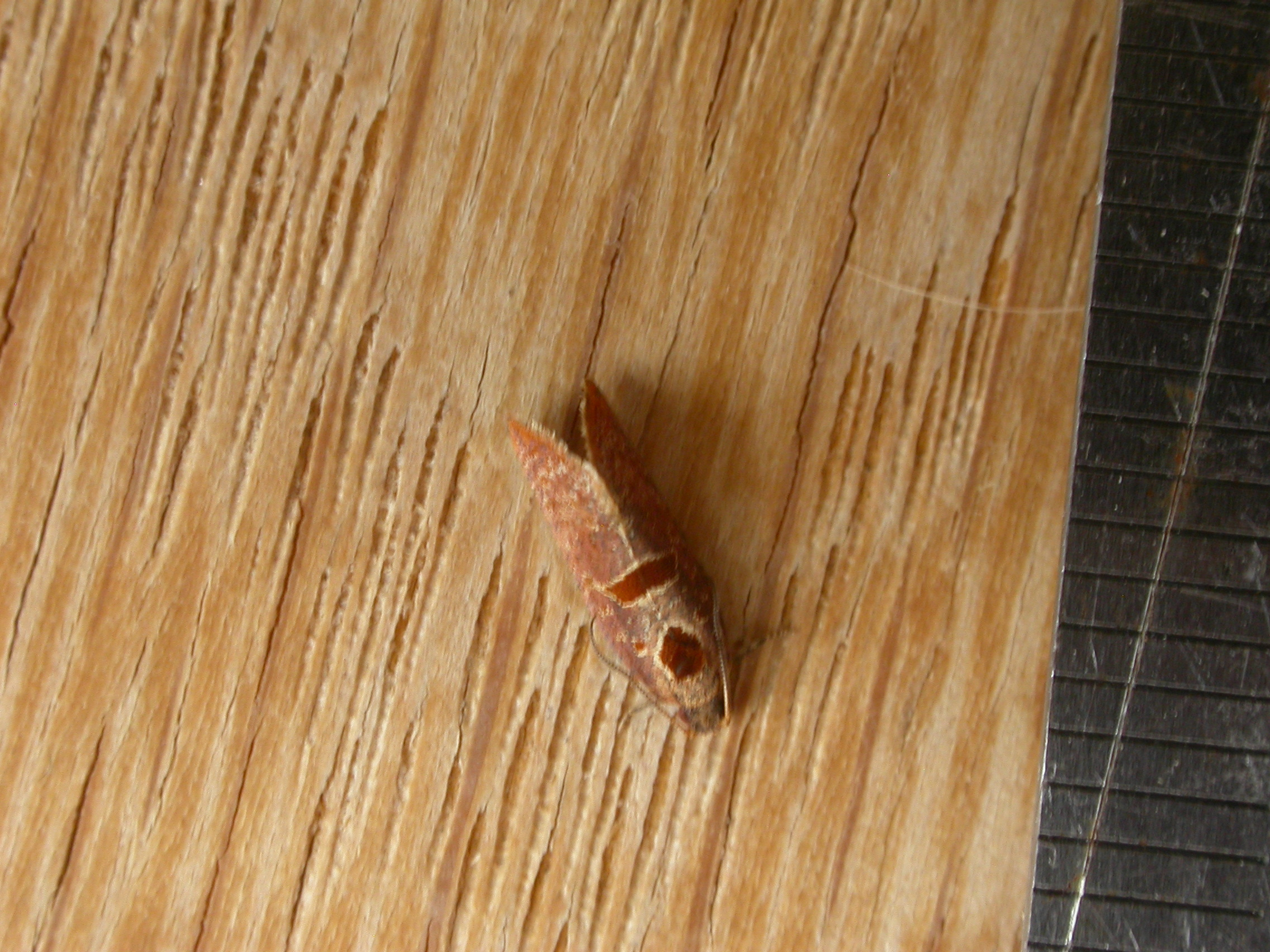

Scientific classification
- Kingdom: Animalia
- Phylum: Arthropoda
- Class: Insecta
- Order: Lepidoptera
- Family: Tortricidae
- Genus: Glyphidoptera
- Species: G. insignana

Binomial name
- Glyphidoptera insignana (Meyrick, 1881)

Synonyms
- Pyrgotis insignana Meyrick, 1881

= Glyphidoptera insignana =

Species of moth

Glyphidoptera insignana is a moth of the family Tortricidae. It is known from Australia, including the Australian Capital Territory, Tasmania, New South Wales and Victoria.

The wingspan is about 15 mm.

The larvae feed on Eucalyptus and Syncarpia species.
