= Diamond (surname) =

Diamond is the Anglicized form of Diamant or Ó Diamáin, which are German-Ashkenazi Jewish and Irish surnames respectively. There are some Diamonds in the United Kingdom whose name has French roots.

Notable people with the surname include:

- Alex Diamond (born 1967), German visual artist, pseudonym of Jörg Heikhaus
- Alice Diamond (1896–1952), English career retail thief
- Amy Diamond (born 1992), former stage name for English-Swedish pop singer Amy Deasismont
- Ana Diamond (born 1995), British civil rights activist and unionist politician
- Andrew Diamond (born 1969), stage name for American reggae artist Andrew Seidel
- Andrew Diamond (professor) (born 1967), American historian
- Ann Diamond (born 1951), Canadian poet and novelist
- Ann Diamond (midwife) (c. 1831–1881), New Zealand hotel-keeper, storekeeper, midwife
- Anne Diamond (born 1954), British journalist and broadcaster
- Arnold Diamond (1915–1992), British actor
- Arthur Diamond (c. 1844–1906), Australian businessperson and politician
- Artie Diamond (1929–1976), American boxer
- Aubrey Diamond (1923–2006), British lawyer and educator
- Austin Diamond (1874–1966), Australian cricketer
- Barry Diamond, (born 1951), American comedian
- Barry Diamond (footballer) (born 1960), Scottish footballer
- Bernard Diamond (1827–1892), Irish recipient of the Victoria Cross
- Bernard L. Diamond (1912–1990), American psychiatrist and legal scholar
- Beverley Diamond (born 1948), Canadian pianist and feminist ethnomusicologist
- Bill Diamond (born 1957), American puppeteer and producer
- Billy Diamond (1949–2010), Cree chief
- Bob Diamond (banker) (born 1951), Anglo-American banker and business executive of Irish descent
- Bobby Diamond (1943–2019), American actor and lawyer
- Charles Diamond (1858–1934), Irish newspaper entrepreneur and politician
- Charley Diamond (1936–2020), American football player
- Cora Diamond (born 1937), U.S.-born philosopher
- Dave Diamond (1936–2014), American radio disc jockey
- David Diamond (composer) (1915–2005), American classical composer
- David Diamond (screenwriter), American screenwriter
- David Diamond (theatre), Canadian theatre director
- David Diamond (producer) (1900–1979), American film producer
- David M. Diamond, American neuroscientist
- Debi Diamond (born 1965), American pornographic actress
- Dion Diamond (born 1941), American civil rights activist
- Don Diamond (1921–2011), American actor
- Dustin Diamond (1977–2021), American actor
- Dustin Diamond (born 1981), American Security Specialist
- Fred Diamond (born 1964), American mathematician
- Gregg Diamond (1949–1999), American musician
- Hannah Diamond (born 1991), British singer, songwriter, photographer and visual artist
- Hannah Diamond (netball) (born 2003), English netball player
- Harold Diamond (1926–1982), American art dealer
- Harry Diamond (disambiguation), several people
- I. A. L. Diamond (1920–1988), Romanian-born American film writer
- Jack Diamond (disambiguation), several people
- Jack "Legs" Diamond (1897–1931), Irish-American gangster
- Jared Diamond (born 1937), American biologist, physiologist, biogeographer and author
- Jeremy Diamond (journalist), American journalist
- Jim Diamond (music producer) (born 1965), American studio engineer, producer and bass player
- Jim Diamond (singer) (1951–2015), Scottish rock musician
- Jody Diamond (born 1953), American composer, performer, writer, publisher, editor, and educator
- John Diamond (journalist) (1953–2001), British Jewish broadcaster and journalist
- John Diamond, Baron Diamond (1907–2004), British politician
- John Roberson Diamond (1820–1880), Confederate cavalry officer
- King Diamond (born 1956), Danish heavy metal musician
- Lance Diamond (1945–2015), American lounge singer and radio personality
- Larry Diamond (born 1951), political scientist
- Lou Diamond (1897–1951), US Marine
- Marian Diamond (1926–2017), professor of anatomy at the University of California, Berkeley
- Martha Diamond (1944–2023), American artist
- Michael Diamond (sport shooter) (born 1972), Australian target shooter
- Milton Diamond (1934–2024), American professor of anatomy and reproductive biology
- Mya Diamond (born 1981), Hungarian pornographic actress
- Neil Diamond (born 1941), American singer/songwriter
- Patrick Diamond (born 1974), British politician and policy advisor
- Paul Diamond (born 1961), Croatia-born Canadian wrestler
- Paul S. Diamond (born 1953), United States District Judge
- Peter Diamond (born 1940), American economist
- Phil Diamond (born 1958), professor at University of Manchester
- Randy Diamond (born 1987), Honduran footballer
- Rebecca Diamond (born 1967), American television journalist
- Rebecca Diamond (born 1988), American economist
- Reed Diamond (born 1967), American actor
- Sara Diamond (academic administrator) (born 1954), Canadian artist and former university president
- Sara Diamond (singer) (born 1995), Canadian singer/songwriter
- Sara Diamond (sociologist) (born 1958), American writer, sociologist and attorney
- Sarah E. Diamond, American ecologist
- Scott Diamond (born 1986), Canadian baseball pitcher
- Selma Diamond (1920–1985), Canadian-born comedic actress and TV writer
- Shea Diamond (born 1978), American singer-songwriter
- Simon-Pierre Diamond (born 1985), Canadian politician
- Stanley Diamond (1922–1991), American anthropologist
- Zander Diamond (born 1985), Scottish footballer

== Fictional characters ==
- Bob Diamond (comics), a Marvel Comics character
- Richard Diamond, a private detective that aired on radio from 1949 to 1953, and on television from 1957 to 1960
- Marlena Diamond, character in Cloverfield

== See also ==
- Diamond (disambiguation)
- Diamond (given name)
- Damond and Dimond, similar names
