= Diamond (disambiguation) =

Diamond is the hardest known natural material.

Diamond or diamonds may also refer to:

== Other common meanings ==
- Diamond (gemstone), use of the mineral as a gemstone
- Diamonds (suit), in a standard deck of cards

== People ==
- Diamond (surname)
- Diamond (given name), a unisex given name
- Thomas Pitt (1653–1726), English merchant nicknamed "Diamond" Pitt for his ownership of the Regent Diamond
- Diamond (rapper) (born 1988), American rapper
- Diamond* (rapper), American rapper signed to YSL Records
- Alex Diamond, pseudonym of German artist Jörg Heikhaus (born 1967)
- Wayne Daniel or Diamond (born 1956), retired cricketer from Barbados
- Ramon Dekkers or the Diamond (1969–2013), former Muay Thai and kickboxer
- Malaipet or the Diamond (born 1981), mixed martial artist, kickboxer and Muay Thai fighter
- Diamond, a member of the TV show American Gladiators
- "Diamond" Dallas Page (born 1956), American professional wrestler
- "Diamond" Timothy Flowers, American professional wrestler from All-Star Wrestling
- Diamond (wrestler), Mexican professional wrestler
- Dustin Poirier, MMA fighter, nicknamed "The Diamond"

== Places ==
=== United States ===
- Diamond, Alaska, a historical location in Denali Borough, Alaska
- Diamond, Georgia, an unincorporated community
- Diamond, Illinois, a village
- Diamond, Indiana, an unincorporated town
- Diamond, Louisiana, an unincorporated community
- Diamond, Missouri, a city
- Diamond, Ohio, an unincorporated community
- Diamond, Oregon, an unincorporated community
- Diamond, Kanawha County, West Virginia, an unincorporated community
- Diamond, Logan County, West Virginia, an unincorporated community
- Diamond, U.S. Virgin Islands, a settlement
- The Diamond (Longs Peak), a cliff on Longs Peak in Colorado
- Diamond Brook, a tributary of the Passaic River, New Jersey
- Diamond Hill (Cumberland, Rhode Island)
- Diamond Island (Kentucky)
- Diamond Mountains (Nevada)
- Diamond Peak (disambiguation)
- Diamond Springs, California, formerly Diamond, a census-designated place
- Diamond Valley (Nevada)
- Diamond Island (New York), an island on Lake George (New York)
- Diamond Island (Montana), an island in the Yellowstone River
- Diamond Island (Vermont), an island in Lake Champlain
- Diamond Lake (disambiguation)
- Diamond Township, Cherokee County, Iowa

=== Elsewhere ===
- Diamond Hill, Kowloon, Hong Kong
- Diamond Hill (Ireland)
- Diamond Hill, site of the 1900 Second Boer War Battle of Diamond Hill
- Diamond Island (Tasmania), Australia
- Diamond Island (Myanmar)
- Diamond Island (Grenadines)
- Diamond Lake (Ontario), Canada, various lakes
- Three lakes in New Zealand; see List of lakes of New Zealand
- The Diamond (Enniskillen), the town square in Enniskillen, County Fermanagh, Northern Ireland

== Businesses ==
- Diamond Aircraft Industries, Austria
- Diamond Bank, Nigeria
- Diamond Comic Distributors, North America
- Diamond Comics, India
- Diamond East Midlands, a British bus company
- Diamond Foods, California, US
- Diamond Insurance, British car insurer
- Diamond Management & Technology Consultants, Chicago, US
- Diamond Match Company, US
  - Diamond Rubber Company, a former subsidiary
- Diamond Multimedia, a computer hardware and electronics company
- Diamond North West, a British bus company
- Diamond Publishing, UK
- Diamond Select Toys, US
- Diamond West Midlands, a British bus company
- Diamond's, a former department store chain, Phoenix, Arizona, US
- The Diamond (department store), Charleston, West Virginia, US

== Literature ==
- Diamond (novel), a 2013 children's novel by Jacqueline Wilson
- The Diamond, a 1998 fantasy novel by J. Robert King and Ed Greenwood

== Music ==
=== Albums ===
- Diamond (12012 album), 2007
- Diamond (4Minute album), 2010
- Diamond (Constant Deviants album), 2012
- Diamond (Jaci Velasquez album), 2012
- Diamond (Spandau Ballet album), 1982
- Diamond (Stick to Your Guns album), 2012
- Diamond – The Ultimate Collection, by Westlife, 2012
- Diamonds – The Best of Dio, 1992
- Diamonds (Enforcer album), 2010
- Diamonds (Elton John album), 2017
- Diamonds (Hawk Nelson album), 2015
- Diamonds (Waylon Jennings album), 2026
- Diamonds, a box set by Boney M., 2015
- Diamonds, by Enforcer, 2010
- Diamonds, by Johnnyswim, 2014
- Diamonds, by Kraan, 2010

=== Songs ===
- "Diamond" (Bump of Chicken song), 2000
- "Diamond" (Julian Austin song), 1997
- "Diamond", by Dreamcatcher from The End of Nightmare, 2019
- "Diamond", by Duster from Contemporary Movement, 2000
- "Diamond", by Exo from The War, 2017
- "Diamond", by f(x) from 4 Walls, 2015
- "Diamond", by Mamamoo from Travel, 2020
- "Diamond", by Misia from Mars & Roses, 2004
- "Diamond", by Via Verdi, 1986
- "Diamonds" (Amanda Lear song), 1980
- "Diamonds" (Fabolous song), 2007
- "Diamonds" (Herb Alpert song), 1986
- "Diamonds" (Morgan Evans song), 2019
- "Diamonds" (Megan Thee Stallion and Normani song), 2020
- "Diamonds" (Princess Princess song), 1989
- "Diamonds" (Rihanna song), 2012
- "Diamonds" (Sam Smith song), 2020
- "Diamonds" (Starboy Nathan song), 2011
- "Diamonds" (instrumental), by Jet Harris and Tony Meehan, 1963
- "Diamonds", by The Boxer Rebellion, from Promises, 2013
- "Diamonds", by Chris Rea from Deltics, 1979
- "Diamonds", by Common from Nobody Smiling, 2014
- "Diamonds", by Gabi DeMartino from Paintings of Me, 2022
- "Diamonds", by the Hunter Brothers from Been a Minute, 2021
- "Diamonds", by Kylie Minogue from Tension II, 2024
- "Diamonds", by Luke Hemmings from When Facing the Things We Turn Away From, 2021
- "Diamonds", by Manafest from The Moment, 2014
- "Diamonds", by Waylon Jennings and Glen Campbell from Diamonds, 2026

=== Other uses in music ===
- Diamond Records, a label based in New York City
- The Diamonds, a Canadian singing quartet of the 1950s and 1960s
- The Diamonds (Jamaican band), a reggae band
- Diamond certification or record, a music recording sales certification
- Diamond, a former alias of Cascada

== Games ==
- Diamond (game), a board game
- Diamonds (video game), 1992, for Macintosh
- Diamond (Shugo Chara!) or Dia, a character
- Pokémon Diamond and Pearl, 2006 video games for the Nintendo DS
  - Pokémon Brilliant Diamond and Shining Pearl, 2021 video games for the Nintendo Switch

== Film and television ==
- Diamonds (1920 film), a German silent crime film by Friedrich Feher
- Diamonds (1937 film), a German crime film directed by Eduard von Borsody
- Diamonds (1939 film), an Italian comedy
- The Diamond (film), a 1954 British 3-D movie
- Diamonds (1947 film), a Soviet drama film
- Diamonds (1975 film), an Israeli-American heist film starring Robert Shaw and Shelley Winters
- Diamonds (1999 film), an American comedy starring Kirk Douglas and Dan Aykroyd
- Diamonds (2024 film), an Italian film
- Diamonds (Canadian TV series), a Canadian television series that aired on Global from 1987 to 1989
- Diamonds (UK TV series), a British television series that aired on ITV in 1981
- "Diamonds" (Charlie Jade), an episode of Charlie Jade
- Diamond Destiny, a baby character in the film Storks

== Sports ==
- Baseball diamond or baseball field
- The Diamond (Richmond, Virginia), a baseball stadium
- Airdrieonians F.C. or Diamonds, a Scottish football club
- Australia national netball team or Diamonds
- Auckland Diamonds, a New Zealand former netball team
- Denver Diamonds, an American women's soccer team
- Diamonds (Super Fours), a women's cricket team that competed in the Super Fours
- Diamond X, a disc golf course in Montana
- Nashville Diamonds, an American soccer team
- Northern Diamonds, a women's cricket team based in Yorkshire and North East England
- Texas Revolution (indoor football) or Arkansas Diamonds, an American indoor football team
- Waterloo Diamonds (1989–1993), a former baseball team based in Waterloo, Iowa
- Yorkshire Diamonds, a women's cricket team that competed in the Women's Cricket Super League

== Ships and boats ==
- HMS Diamond, various Royal Navy ships
- Diamond (1798 ship), a full-rigged merchant ship
- Diamond (1823 ship), a three-masted square rigger
- Diamond (1835 ship), an Isle of Man-built merchant ship
- Diamond (narrowboat), a canal boat of the UK
- Diamond, a ship of the Third Supply fleet to Virginia colony in 1609
- MS F Diamond, a ferry in service 2007–09, renamed MS Diamond in 2010 before being scrapped
- Diamond (HBC vessel); see Hudson's Bay Company vessels

== Other uses ==
- Rhombus (◊), a shape
  - Lozenge (shape) (◊), a type of rhombus
- Diamonds (ballet), third movement of George Balanchine's Jewels
- Diamond (comics), a fictional character in the NEW-GEN comic books published by Marvel Comics
- Diamond (dog), supposedly owned by Sir Isaac Newton
- Diamond (grape), a wine grape varietal grown in the Finger Lakes AVA
- DIAMOND (project), for optimizing the operation of wastewater treatment plants
- Diamond (typography), the typographic size between pearl and brilliant
- Diamond Light Source, a British synchrotron research facility
- Diamond principle (◊), in mathematical set theory
- Diamond Tower, a skyscraper in Ramat Gan, Israel
- The Diamond (skyscraper), in Taipei, Taiwan
- Snipe Diamond, a 1980s British ultralight aircraft

== See also ==
- Diamond crossing, a level crossing of two rail tracks
- Diamond interchange, type of highway interchange
- Diamond knot, a knot for forming a decorative loop on the end of a cord such as on a lanyard
- Diamond plate, a type of sheet metal with raised lozenges
- Diamond Tree, a giant Karri tree in Western Australia
- Diamant (disambiguation)
- Diamante poem, a form of poetry
- Diament (disambiguation)
- Max Dimont (1912–1992), Finnish American historian and author
- Dymond (disambiguation)
