= Indians in the United States Virgin Islands =

The Indian community in the United States Virgin Islands is made up of Indo-Caribbeans, Indian Americans and other persons of Indian origin. The first Indians in the United States Virgin Islands (USVI) arrived in the Danish colony of Saint Croix in June 1863 as indentured workers. However, the nearly all 325 Indians who came to Saint Croix left the island by the 1870s. Nearly two-thirds returned to India, while the others emigrated to Trinidad and Tobago. Some settled in that country, while others returned to India from Trinidad.

Today, the Indian community in the United States Virgin Islands is primarily made up of Indo-Caribbeans who migrated from other Caribbean countries, as well as other persons of Indian origin. There is also an Indian-American community in the USVI as it is an unincorporated United States territory. As of the 2010 Census of the United States Virgin Islands, an estimated 1,000 persons of Indian descent reside in the territory.

== Indenture ==
Following the abolition of slavery in Saint Croix in the Danish West Indies in 1848, plantation owners on the island sought to find an alternative to African slave labour. Danish Ambassador M. de Bille sent an official request to import Indian indentured laborers, under similar conditions as the French, to the British Government in November 1861. However, the request was denied. British Secretary of State for India Sir Charles Wood stated that "more convincing legislation" was required from Saint Croix. Historian Lomarsh Roopnarine notes that the British were generally reluctant to send Indian indentured workers to non-British colonies, particularly towards the start of the indenture system. Roopnarine suggests that this might have been because the British saw the workers as an economic advantage for the British Empire. However, the British permitted immigration of Indian indentured laborers to the French West Indies in 1860, believing that the French would hire laborers from Africa if they did not receive Indian workers. The British permitted immigration in 1863 following two years of negotiations with the Colonial Council of Saint Croix. The British Parliament enacted Act VII of 1863 permitting Denmark to transport indentured workers to Saint Croix.

Unlike in other Caribbean colonies such as British Guyana, Danish plantation owners were not permitted to directly hire Indian indentured labor. Under new guidelines introduced by the British Indian government in the early 1860s, Danish plantation owners had to negotiate the hiring of indentured workers directly with the British and the British Indian governments. This was intended to curb abuse of workers particularly because these workers would not be in a British colony, and therefore not under British jurisdiction. Among the rules imposed, was the requirement that Indian workers be transported safely, and that a British Agent or a British Consular and a British Protector be appointed to inspect the departure site as well the Saint Croix plantations. The British also reserved the right to halt immigration at any time they deemed necessary. Despite these guidelines, in practice, plantation owners in Saint Croix exploited Indian indentured laborers. This was due to several factors. The contracts offered to workers were complex. Roopnarine states, "The contracts consisted of laws and ordinances not easily comprehensible to modern researchers, much less to the nineteenth century Indian peasantry." High-levels of illiteracy among the workers meant that many were unable to comprehend the contracts they were agreeing to. The British Government did not monitor the day-to-day operation of the indenture system, delegating it to the British Indian government which was unconcerned with enforcing the guidelines. Danish plantation owners also took advantage of the system, taking steps to ensure that the Protector of Immigrants who inspected plantations provided a positive report regardless of actual conditions of the workers. Racism was also a factor in the indifference of colonial administrators towards Indian indentured workers.

The only ship that carried indentured workers from India to the Danish West Indies, a steamship named Mars, departed from Calcutta and arrived in Saint Croix on 15 June 1863. The voyage took about 3 months. The Coolie Journal, a British colonial record from 1863 states that there were 321 Indians on board the Mars - 244 men, 60 women, and 17 children. The Journal also notes that 3 Indians died during the voyage. However, other sources provide differing figures. An estimated 318-326 Indian indentured workers were on board the ship. The majority of the Indians that went to Saint Croix came from the provinces of Bihar and Bengal. At the time, both regions suffered from famines, lack of employment, civil unrest and high rate of poverty. These conditions encouraged some Indians to migrate to Saint Croix as indentured workers in hopes of escaping adverse conditions at home. Among the colonies that employed indentured labor, Saint Croix received the second smallest number of Indian workers after the island of Nevis which received 315 Indian workers. If the island of Saint Kitts which received 337 Indian workers is included with Nevis, as part of the modern-day Saint Kitts and Nevis, then Saint Croix received the smallest number of Indian laborers.

Upon arriving in Saint Croix, the indentured workers were put straight to work at 12 plantations across the island - Lower Bethlehem (64 immigrants), River (56), Mount Pleasant (50), Estate Diamond (25), Goodhope (25), Diamond (19), Golden Grove (16), Fountain (15), Upper Love (15), Lower Love (11), La Grande Princesse (10), and Rattan (10). The Indian workers were not provided any time to acclimatize to their new surroundings. Per the terms of their contracts, the indenture period was 5 years, or would expire in 1868. Plantation owners were required to provide free housing, basic medical care, minimum wage, and basic rations to all workers during the indenture period. Breach of contract by either party was punishable by fines. However, in practice, plantation owners rarely provided these services to workers and were rarely punished except in a few cases of severe working conditions. Instead of adequate housing, Indian workers were placed in abandoned dwellings previously occupied by African slave laborers. Each one-room dwelling accommodated between 7 and 11 Indian workers. The houses lacked indoor plumbing, which accelerated the spread of diseases such as chigoes, cholera, and dysentery among the workers. Meanwhile, Indian workers were often fined and docked wages for alleged breaches of contract.

Workers were required to work nine hours a day and six days a week. They were involved in all aspects of sugar cane plantation from weeding to transporting the harvested product to sugar factories. Plantation owners often punished workers for alleged breaches of contract by fines or physical punishment such as flogging. While many Indians submitted to the harsh conditions, others engaged in strikes, riots, and some forms of violent protest. Plantation owners also failed to provide basic medical care to the workers. Several colonial records describe the condition of the "sick-houses" were workers were treated as "heart-rending and frightful". The British Consul sent a dispatch to the British Colonial Office reporting that Indian workers in Saint Croix suffered from poor health caused by inadequate diet, overwork, ill-treatment, neglect, and diseases. More than 6% of the Indians who arrived on board the Mars died within their first year on Saint Croix. The mortality rate of Indians was higher than the 5% recorded among local laborers despite the locals experiencing a fever epidemic at the time. Around 40% of Indian workers died on the Rattan plantation alone.

=== Abolition ===
The mistreatment of Indian workers on the island eventually led the British and British Indian governments to ban immigration to Saint Croix at the end of the first indenture period in 1868. Unlike a similar ban on immigration to British Guyana which was lifted in 1845, the ban on Saint Croix remained and the immigration of Indian indentured workers to the island never resumed. The decision was backed by a negative report filed by the British Consul in Saint Croix, whose job was to oversee the conditions of Indian workers. According to the Consul, although indentured workers repeatedly expressed a desire to be free, most did not condemn the system after their indenture periods ended. Instead, they were disappointed that they were unable to make much money from their contracts. When the indenture period expired in 1868, nearly two-thirds of the Indian workers chose to return to India. The Dorothea Melchior departed Saint Croix on 16 July 1868, with around 250 Indians on board, and arrived in Calcutta on 16 December 1868. According to the Protector of Immigrants at Calcutta, 4 adult males and 1 woman died during the voyage. Four births also took place, however, three of the newborns died on board. The Protector also claimed that the workers "expressed themselves perfectly satisfied with their treatment during the voyage and spoke highly of the kindness of commanders and officers."

The Indian indenture system was expensive for the Danish colonial government. Between 1859 and 1878, the Danish spent an estimated $138,000 to facilitate the immigration of workers of all ethnicities to Saint Croix. Between 1863 and 1865, the immigration of Indian indentured workers alone cost the government $57,786 (42% of $138,000). The Danish colonial government spent $34,214 to bring Indian workers to Saint Croix in 1863, and $15,283 for their return voyage. This cost place a large financial strain on the government, as well as plantation owners who financed the acquisition of workers though loans. Combined with the lower cost of acquiring workers from neighboring Caribbean islands the large expense contributed to collapse of the Indian indentured system in Saint Croix.

The 1863 Coolie Journal shows that Indian workers who returned to India in 1868 had a total savings of US$12,000 or £2,500. The average savings per worker is much lower than that among Indian workers in other Caribbean colonies. Historians believe that this amount does not reflect the true savings of Indian workers in Saint Croix. It is believed that Indian workers in Saint Croix did not use the banking system nor disclose their savings to colonial authorities due to distrust. Instead, Indian workers in Saint Croix hid most of their savings in mattresses, holes in trees, or buried underground. During their return voyage to India, many hid their money on their person and did not disclose it to port authorities. Others used their savings to purchase gold, which was not recorded in the official records even if disclosed. However, other historians dispute this argument. They argue that savings among Indian in Saint Croix were low because they had less freedom and rights in Saint Croix compared to colonies such as British Guyana, where they could engage in trade and business after completing indenture and earn higher incomes. Another reason cited for the lower savings are heavier fines imposed on Indian workers in Saint Croix, and the higher charges they were required to pay for basic commodities. For instance, Indian workers were charged 40 cents for the food supplied to them which was much higher than the 25 cents local workers were charged for the same quantity of food. Indian historian Kumar Sircar states that of 245 Indians who returned home, only 149 had any savings while 96 were penniless. Upon arriving in Calcutta, some of these workers were declared insane and delusional. Many refused to return to their native villages, fearing that they would be ostracized for abandoning their community and moving to the Caribbean, and instead chose to settle in Calcutta.

=== Emigration ===
Only 30 Indians chose to re-indenture after the first indenture period expired in 1868. They accepted the Danish government's offer of a one-time payment of US$40 in exchange for re-indenturing for an additional 5 years and forfeiting their right of free return to India. All 30 of these Indians emigrated to Trinidad, some time after their second indenture period expired in 1873. Some sought employment in the country and settled in Trinidad, while others returned to India.

According to historian Kumar Sircar, 65 Indians from Saint Kitts migrated to Saint Croix in the 1870s after completing their indenture period in the former. Some of these Indians are recorded in the 1880 and 1890 Censuses of Saint Croix as "coolies". This group of Kittitian Indians is sometimes mistaken for the Indians that arrived in Saint Croix aboard the Mars in 1863.

== Present-day ==
All of the Indians who arrived in Saint Croix as indentured workers in 1863 left the island by the 1870s. The Indian community in the United States Virgin Islands today is primarily made up of Indo-Caribbeans who migrated from other Caribbean countries, as well as other persons of Indian origin. There is also an Indian American community in the Virgin Islands as it is an unincorporated United States territory.

Roopnarine notes that "East Indians do not fit the general definition of minority groups in the USVI or even in the wider Caribbean. They have neither been singled out openly for differential and unequal treatment nor exposed to constant incidents of discrimination." Indians in the USVI are generally financially stable and tend to dominate the microeconomic sector and run many department stores in the territory. Roopnarine states that Indians in the Virgin Islands have engaged in "selective assimilation" while maintaining social, religious and cultural ties to India through contacts with the larger Indian community in Trinidad. The community established an Indian cultural centre and a Hindu temple in the United States Virgin Islands.

Roopnarine states that the despite making significant contributions to the USVI, Indians "are viewed with much skepticism by "Native Virgin Islanders" as a group that has arrived recently and has virtually taken over the microeconomic sector on St. Thomas."

According to the 2010 Census of the United States Virgin Islands, about 1.4% of the territory's total population was Asian which includes people of Indian descent. The Census does not record people of Indian descent separately. Roopnarine estimates that around 1,000 people of Indian origin reside in the United States Virgin Islands.
