= Diamant (disambiguation) =

Diamant is a French expendable launch rocket system.

Diamant may also refer to:

== People ==
- Diamant (surname)

== Transportation ==
- Diamant (German bicycle company), established 1862
- Diamant (Norwegian bicycle company), established 1901
- Diamant (train), an international train linking Belgium and Germany
- Diamant (Antwerp premetro station), a station on the Antwerp Pre-metro
- Diamant premetro station, a station on the Brussels Metro
- FFA Diamant, a Swiss family of gliders
- ITV Diamant, a French paraglider
- Ocean Diamond, a cruise ship formerly named Le Diamant
- Piel Diamant, a French single-engine aircraft

== Places ==
- Canton of Le Diamant, a former canton in Martinique
- Le Diamant, a town and commune in Martinique
- Cap Diamant, the cape on which Quebec City is located
- Diamond Rock (Rocher du Diamant), an island off the coast of Martinique

== Arts and entertainment ==
- Diamant (board game), a multiplayer game designed by Alan R. Moon and Bruno Faidutti
- Diamant (film), a 1916 Dutch silent film
- "Diamant" (song), a 2020 song by Swiss singer Lucas Hänni

== Other uses ==
- Diamant Yaoundé, a football club based in Yaoundé, Cameroon
- Diamant, a Czech high yield, short height, mutant barley variety

== See also ==
- Diamond (disambiguation)
- Diament (disambiguation)
- Dimond (disambiguation)
- Dyment (disambiguation)
- Dymond (disambiguation)
