= John Allen (settler) =

English farmer

John Allen (1806–1879) was an English settler in the colony of Van Diemen's Land (later Tasmania) who had some success as a farmer. He also made an early crude sketch of some aboriginals which was brought to England and formed the basis of an oil painting now held by the Tasmanian Museum and Art Gallery.

== Life ==
"Panoramic View of Hobarton", in Prinsep's Journal of a Voyage from Calcutta to Van Diemen's Land (London: Smith & Elder, 1833)

John Allen was born in county Somerset, England, on 16 November 1806, and left London for the colony of Van Diemen's Land in the early part of 1826 in the ship Hugh Crawford, commanded by Captain William Langdon, Royal Navy.

He arrived in Hobart Town on 26 October of the same year, and on the recommendation of Governor Arthur, he resolved to go to Oyster Bay with W. Lyne and family. They started in a small vessel a few days before Christmas, and spent Christmas Day in Stewart's Harbour, now called Port Arthur. Shortly after they arrived in Oyster Bay, and, landing at a place now called Moulting Bay, the first things they saw were flocks of kangaroos, which were very numerous then.

=== Aboriginal conflict ===
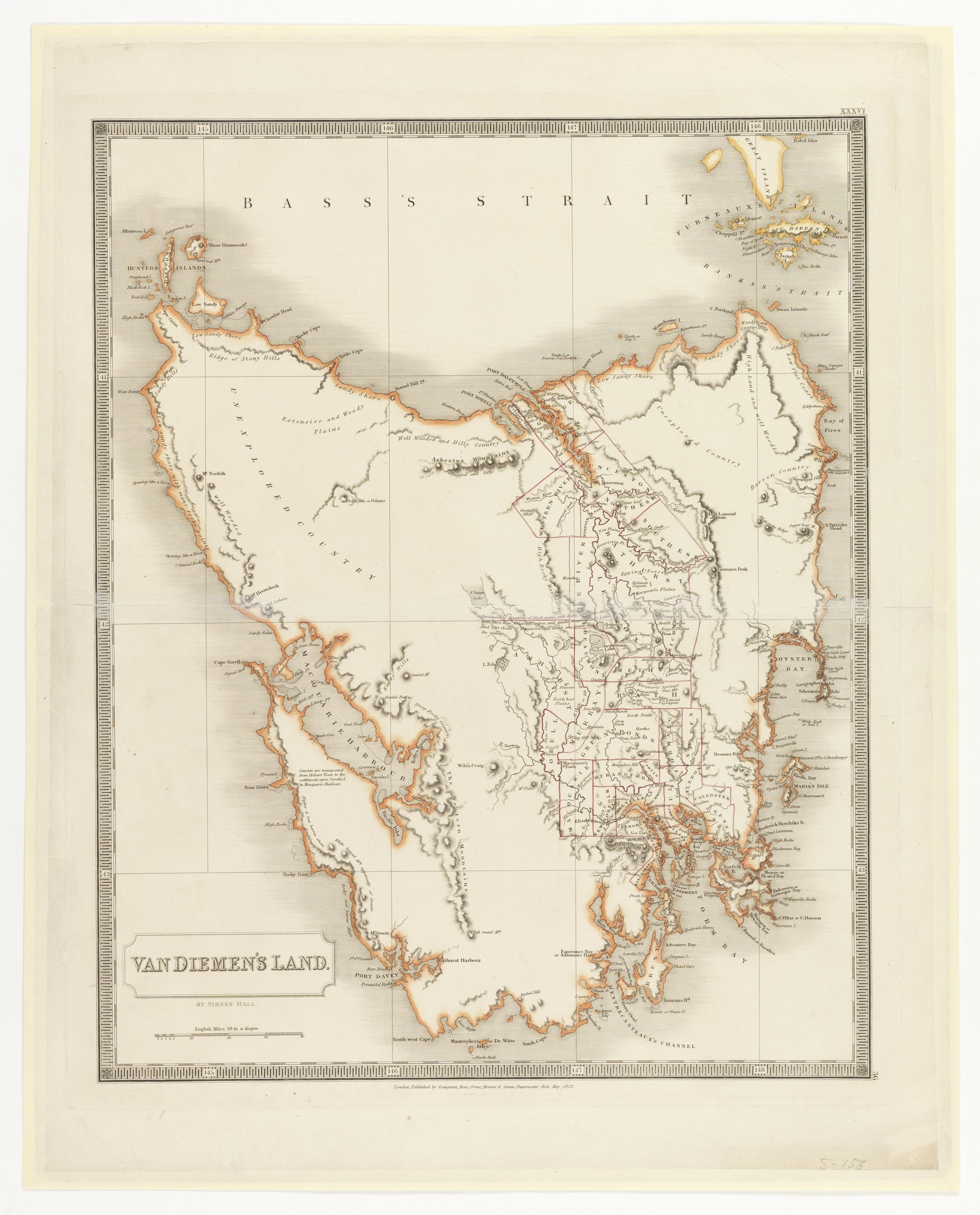
Map of Van Diemen's Land, 1828.

Allen took up his first grant of land at Milton, in Glamorgan, near Swansea. In March 1828, in the context of mutual ongoing violence, when he had finished reaping and secured all his crops, and when all hands were away except one boy, some aboriginals came and burnt all the buildings, the stacks of wheat, and nearly everything Allen possessed; the loss being about £300, besides books, papers, etc., which could not be replaced.

Undaunted, he set to work again. His obituary in The Mercury noted the following anecdote: "[S]o determined was he to succeed that for nine months after the fire he never took off his clothes except on Sunday, and used to sleep on a sheet of bark, with his musket beside him, and his ammunition pouch strapped around him, until he received another bed from England."

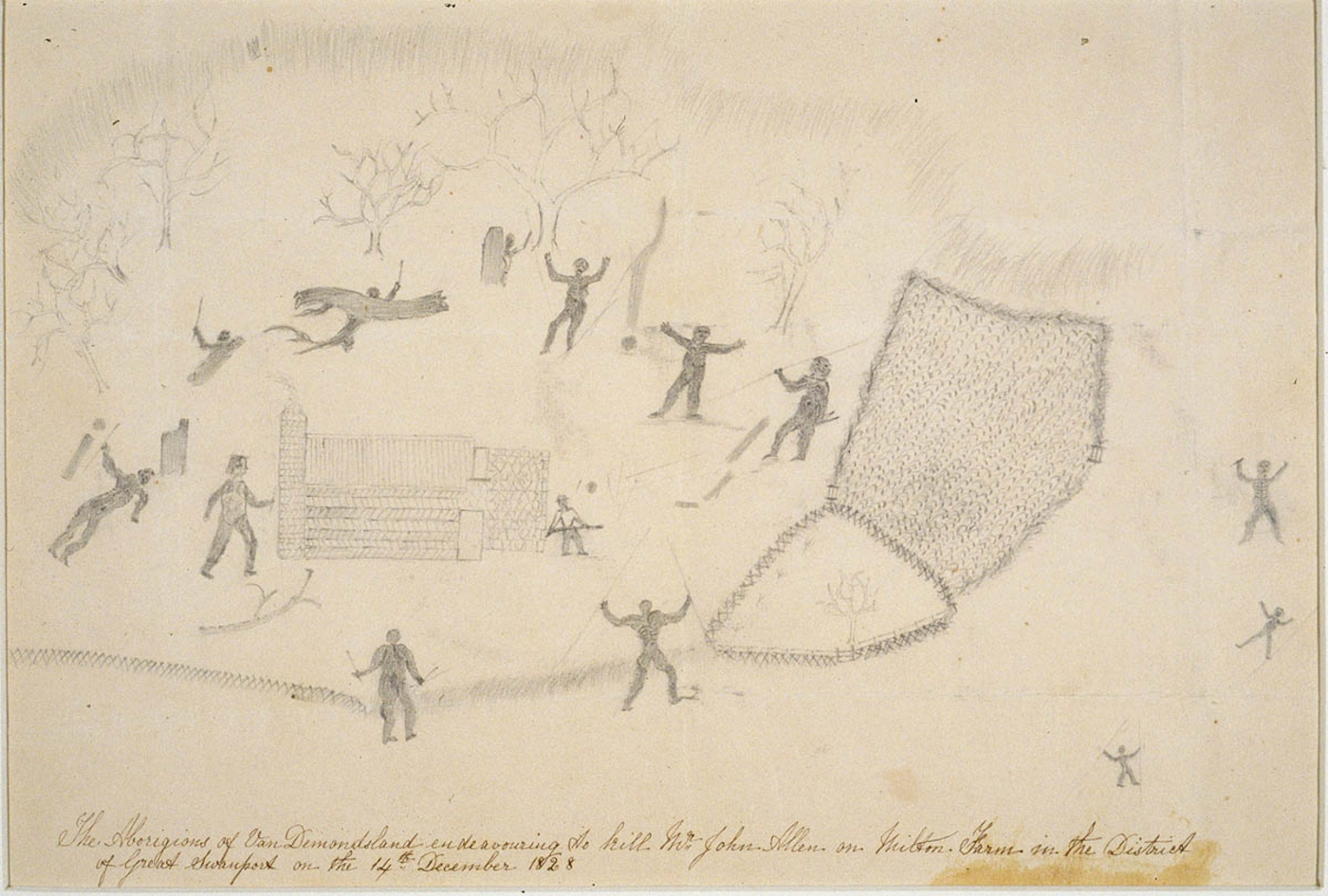
Drawing of the incident at Milton farm, probably not contemporary.

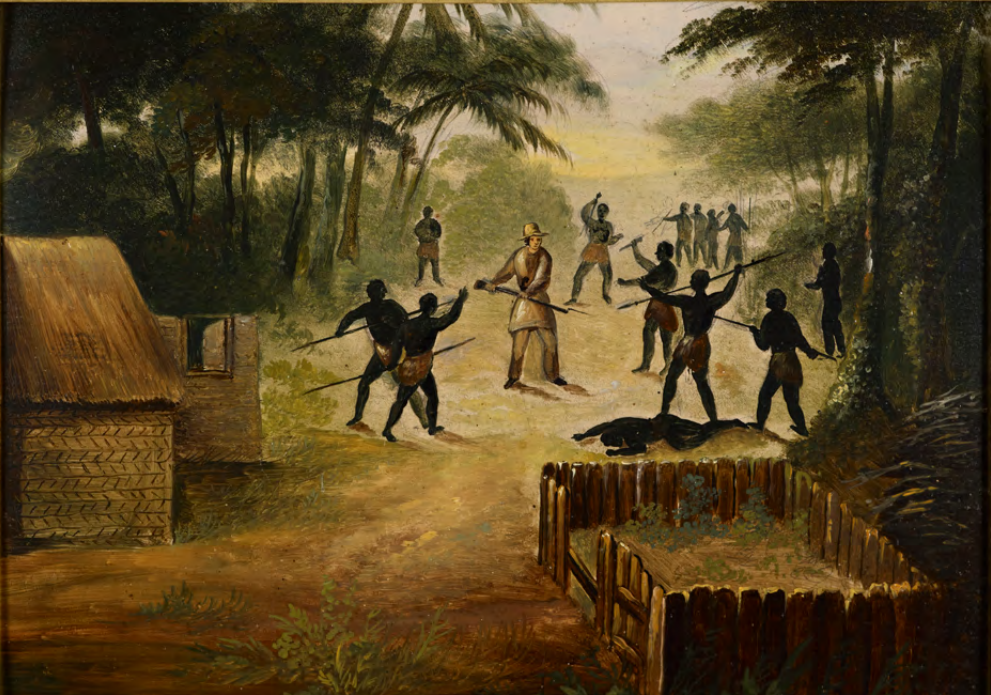
The incident at Milton farm, painted in Britain after a near-contemporary sketch by Allen, 1833. (Note: Gough has satirised this representation in her own work Silenced history, depicting herself in place of Allen and besieged by a group of white historians who are shown brandishing books instead of spears and proclaiming their authority.)

On 14 or 28 December, in the same year, he fought single handed a tribe of aboriginals, numbering from thirteen to eighteen, besides women (Note: In Allen's obituary in The Mercury, the aboriginal women are called "gins", a term now considered offensive; see also blackgin.) to bring them spears, waddies, etc. For eight hours on one of the hottest days recorded, Allen kept the natives back with a musket and pistol, neither of which he fired; the presentation of the fire-arms in the direction of the aboriginals was apparently sufficient to deter them. He was unhurt. This heroic interpretation of the incident as an attempted murder countered by self-defence has been contested by Julie Gough, who thinks the actions of the aboriginals were intended as a warning.

After this the Police Magistrate at Swansea allowed two soldiers to be stationed on the farm for protection, upon his taking the oath as a special constable, and they remained there about two years. In reprisal for the attacks on farms near Oyster Bay in December 1828, groups of armed colonists pursued the aboriginals and in mid-January 1829 ten natives were shot and two captured at Break O'Day Plains near the Eastern Marshes.

=== Sea travels ===
Allen prospered. In May 1832, he walked to Hobart Town and there found his sister, who had just arrived from England with money for him to return there, his relatives being anxious to see him. Accordingly, he sailed in the barque Science, which was loaded with wool and specie.

For the first six weeks they had bad weather, and then, on 21 June, the ship was caught in a storm at 56°S 125°W. Getting among the icebergs she was struck and capsized, but very soon righted. Allen, who was the first on deck, found the mizzenmast broken short, the mainmast split up, the foremast tottering, the rigging being across the deck, and the bulwarks smashed; besides which nearly all the best hands were gone. The captain gave up all hope of being saved; but Allen determined to make an attempt to save their lives, so he cut away the loose rigging, stopped up the holes in the deck with wool, and with the aid of one or two others, showed that the hull of the ship was still good.

Six days after they fell in with a South Sea whaler, the barque Warren (erroneously called Worrence in the obituary), which took them all on board to the number of fifteen. Allen left in the last boat, after looking round for any valuables; but he had not been told about the specie, which was therefore lost. It is related that one old man would not leave the ship because he could not find his treasury bills; but when all his friends had got aboard the Warren, he was seen beckoning to be taken off, so a boat was sent for him. The hull was set fire to, and she was seen to founder.

The Warren landed the distressed people at Rio de Janeiro, whence Allen went to England in HMS King William IV, a sloop of war, in command of Lord Colchester. The first night he was in England he caught a severe cold, and never had good health while there. He accordingly soon returned to Tasmania, in the barque Ann, and remained there till his death.

=== Death ===
Allen died peacefully at Glamorgan, after an eleven days' illness, and without pain, on 19 December 1879, at the age of 73. His remains were interred at Bicheno on 23 December, there being a very large funeral, many friends coming long distances to be present. The chief mourners were six sons of the deceased, and the pall-bearers were Henry Lyne, Clarence Lyne, Frederick Hume, and Alexander Robertson. His gravestone bears the following inscription:

In / affectionate / remembrance of / JOHN ALLEN. / who departed this life / 19th December 1879. / Aged 75 Years. / Native of Somerset, England. / Arrived in Tasmania 1826 / Fought a tribe of Aborigines single handed / on the 14th December 1828. / Shipwrecked amongst the Ice off Cape Horn / whilst going to England on the 21 June 1832 / Have patience true Christians / Be right understood / Your transient afflictions / Will work for your good / My troubles are over / My sorrows are past / And God has received / His servant at last. / Also ANNE ALLEN. / who departed this life / 18th October 1926. / Aged 92 Years. / "At Rest."

== See also ==
- Wauba Debar

== Sources ==
- Gough, Julie; Marsh, Geoff (24 February 2023). "Silenced history". Museums of History New South Wales.
- "Break O'Day Plains". Colonial Frontier Massacres in Australia, 1788–1930. University of Newcastle.
- "John Allen". Dictionary of Australian Artists Online. Design and Art Australia Online. 27 November 2012 [1 January 1999].
- Our Changing Land: Creating Tasmania (PDF), Tasmanian Museum and Art Gallery, 21 October 2013, pp. 18, 33, 44, ISBN 9781921527340
- "Rus in Urbe". The Launceston Advertiser. 9 February 1829. pp. 2–3.
- "The Aborigions of Van Demonds land endeavouring to kill Mr John Allen on Milton Farm in the District of Great Swanport on the 14th December 1828". State Library of New South Wales.

Attribution:

- "Obituary". The Mercury. 31 December 1879. p. 2.
