= List of shipwrecks in June 1832 =

The list of shipwrecks in June 1832 includes ships sunk, foundered, grounded, or otherwise lost during June 1832.

== 2 June ==
List of shipwrecks: 2 June 1832
Ship	State	Description
Hortense	United Kingdom	The ship was wrecked on the Baleine Rocks, in the Pertuis d'Antioche. She was on a voyage from St. Jago de Cuba to Bordeaux, Gironde.
Jones	United Kingdom	The ship foundered in the Bristol Channel off The Mumbles, Glamorgan.

== 3 June ==
List of shipwrecks: 3 June 1832
Ship	State	Description
Derwent	United Kingdom	The ship was driven ashore at Bathurst, New Brunswick, British North America.

== 5 June ==
List of shipwrecks: 5 June 1832
Ship	State	Description
Maria	United Kingdom	The ship was sighted in the Atlantic Ocean whilst on a voyage from Jamaica to Bristol, Gloucestershire. No further trace, presumed foundered with the loss of all hands.

== 9 June ==
List of shipwrecks: 9 June 1832
Ship	State	Description
Laura	United Kingdom	The ship was abandoned in the Atlantic Ocean. Her crew were rescued by Quevedo (United Kingdom). Laura was on a voyage from Newcastle upon Tyne, Northumberland to Newfoundland, British North America.

== 11 June ==
List of shipwrecks: 11 June 1832
Ship	State	Description
Bandenino Signora del Carmen	Spain	The ship foundered in the Atlantic Ocean. Her crew were rescued.

== 21 June ==
List of shipwrecks: 21 June 1832
Ship	State	Description
Science	United Kingdom	The barque foundered off Cape Horn, Chile. She was set afire and abandoned by her crew, who were rescued by Warren (United States). Science was on a voyage from Van Diemen's Land to London.

== 22 June ==
List of shipwrecks: 22 June 1832
Ship	State	Description
Rob Roy	United States	The schooner capsized in the Atlantic Ocean off Boon Island, Maine with the loss of five lives. Survivors were rescued by the schooner Miriam (United States).

== 24 June ==
List of shipwrecks: 24 June 1832
Ship	State	Description
Mary and Billy	United Kingdom	The ship was driven ashore and wrecked at Lamlash, Isle of Arran.

== 28 June ==
List of shipwrecks: 28 June 1832
Ship	State	Description
Lively	United Kingdom	The ship was wrecked in the Falkland Islands.
William	United Kingdom	The ship struck an iceberg and foundered. Her crew were rescued.

== 30 June ==
List of shipwrecks: 30 June 1832
Ship	State	Description
Blossom	(United Kingdom of Great Britain and Ireland) Bahamas	The ship was wrecked on Ragged Island. Her crew were rescued.

== Unknown date ==
List of shipwrecks: Unknown date 1832
Ship	State	Description
Arethusa	(United Kingdom of Great Britain and Ireland) New South Wales	The ship was wrecked at George Town. She was on a voyage from Sydney to Launceston, Van Diemen's Land.
Brothers	(United Kingdom of Great Britain and Ireland) British North America	The ship was driven ashore at the mouth of the Miramichi River, New Brunswick before 16 June.
Dew Drop	United Kingdom	The ship was driven ashore at Berthier, Lower Canada, British North America in early June. She was on a voyage from London to Quebec City, Lower Canada.
Plover	United Kingdom	The ship was lost in the Caicos Passage on 23 or 27 June. Her crew were rescued. She was on a voyage from Halifax, Nova Scotia, British North America to Jamaica.
HMS Recruit	Royal Navy	The Cherokee-class brig-sloop departed from Falmouth, Cornwall for Halifax, Nova Scotia, British North America. No further trace, presumed foundered in the Atlantic Ocean with the loss of all hands.
Thompson	(United Kingdom of Great Britain and Ireland) British North America	The ship was driven ashore and wrecked on Prince Edward Island.
Triton	United Kingdom	The ship was wrecked on the Barnard Sand, in the North Sea off the coast of Suffolk in early June.
