= Diamond Lake =

Diamond Lake may refer to:

== U.S. geographical locations ==
- Diamond Lake (Idaho), a glacial lake in Elmore County, Idaho
- Diamond Lake (Illinois), a lake, neighborhood and school district in Mundelein
- Diamond Lake Township, Dickinson County, Iowa
- Diamond Lake (Cass County, Michigan), Cass County, Michigan
- Diamond Lake (Kandiyohi County, Minnesota)
- Diamond Lake, Minneapolis, a neighborhood in Minneapolis and its namesake lake
- Diamond Lake Township, Minnesota, a township in Lincoln County
- Diamond Lake (Oregon), a lake in the southern part of Oregon
- Diamond Lake (South Dakota), a lake
- Diamond Lake, Washington, and unincorporated community located in Pend Oreille County, Washington
- Various lakes without articles: see List of lakes named Diamond

== Other geographical locations ==
- Diamond Lake (Ontario), Canada
- At least three lakes in New Zealand: see List of lakes of New Zealand

== In fiction ==
- Diamond Lake (Greyhawk), a fictional mining town, on a lake of the same name, in the Dungeons and Dragons World of Greyhawk

== See also ==
- Diamond Valley Lake, a reservoir in Southern California
