= Dyment =

Dyment may refer to:

- Dyment (surname)
- Dyment, Ontario, Canada
- Dyment Falls, Hamilton, Ontario, Canada
- Dyment Island, Cranton Bay, Antarctica
- R. v. Dyment, a leading Supreme Court of Canada decision on the constitutional right to privacy

== See also ==
- Diamond (disambiguation)
- Diamant (disambiguation)
- Dymond (disambiguation)
- Diament (disambiguation)
- Dimond (disambiguation)
