= Diament =

Diament may refer to:

- James Westcott, also known as James Diament Westcott, Jr.
- Rob Diament, English singer-songwriter
- Popiół i diament, Polish title for the novel Ashes and Diamonds

== See also ==
- Diamond (disambiguation)
- Diamant (disambiguation)
- Dimond (disambiguation)
- Dymond (disambiguation)
- Dyment (disambiguation)
- Diament, Świętokrzyskie Voivodeship (south-central Poland)
