= Dymond =

Dymond may refer to:

== People ==
- Alfred Dymond (1827−1903), Canadian writer and politician
- Charles William Dymond (1832–1915), English civil engineer and antiquarian
- Connor Dymond (born 1994), English footballer
- Edmund Dymond (1901–1953), Scottish physicist and meteorologist
- George Dymond (c. 1797–1835), British architect
- Jonathan Dymond (1796–1828), English Quaker and ethical philosopher
- Jonny Dymond (born 1970), British journalist and broadcaster
- Mark Dymond (born 1974), English actor
- Matthew Dymond (1911–1996), Canadian politician and physician
- Pearl Dymond (1925–2010), New Zealand international lawn bowler
- William Dymond (1917–1940), Royal Air Force flying ace
- Dymond (wrestling), American professional wrestler and "valet"

== Other uses ==
- Dymond Creek, a tributary of the Susquehanna River in Pennsylvania, U.S.
- Dymond, Ontario, a Canadian township, now part of Temiskaming Shores

== See also ==
- Diamond (disambiguation)
- Diamant (disambiguation)
- Diament (disambiguation)
- Dimond (disambiguation)
- Dyment (disambiguation)
