= Boris Hoppek =

German contemporary artist

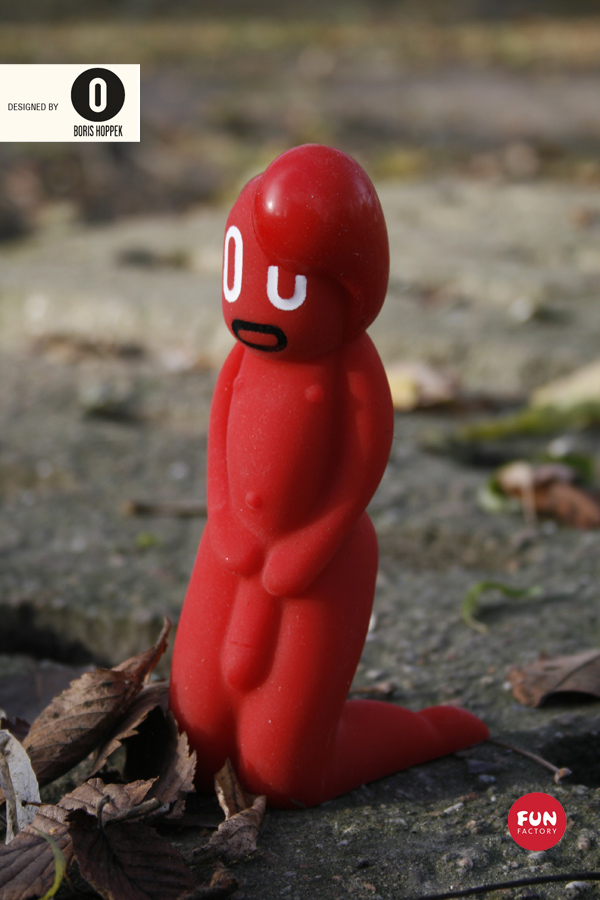
First world ART SEX TOY. Dildo created by Boris Hoppek and Fun Factory

Boris Hoppek (born 1970, in Kreuztal) is a German contemporary artist based in Barcelona. His artistic roots lie in graffiti, but today his work spans painting, photography, video, sculpture and installation art. His work has been used in advertising campaigns as well.

Hoppek's trademark is a symmetric oval, which appears in most of his work either alone or in a constellation of three, thus forming a face. He is the creator of The C'Mons, a fictional rock band at the centre of a viral marketing campaign for the fourth-generation Opel Corsa car. In 2010 he was named as one of the leading figures in urban art by Patrick Nguyen in his book Beyond the Street.

== Early life ==
Boris Hoppek was born in the small village of Kreuztal, Germany, in 1970. He grew up in what he describes as a "hippie community", where he tried marijuana before he could walk and frequently skipped school. At the age of eleven, Hoppek got his first computer, a VIC-20. As teenager he took up photography and videomaking. Hoppek studied to be a tracer and successfully escaped the military draft in Germany by dodging the medical examinations. After being rejected from the Kunstakademie Düsseldorf, Hoppek instead turned to street art.

== Work ==
=== Graffiti ===
Hoppek started writing graffiti in 1990, under the name Forty. In 1995 and 1996 he started exhibiting his work in cafés, a bank and the university library in the small town of Siegen, where he was living at the time. Hoppek later moved to Cologne and later to Berlin, where he established contacts to the local graffiti scene. Between 1993 and 2001 he was featured in several books about street art by the German writer Bernhard van Treeck. Hoppek paints less graffiti in cities nowadays, mainly due to increased police pressure, and focusses on graffiti in rural areas. However, he continues to produce murals. In January 2010 Hoppek created a site-specific mural for the Museum of Contemporary Art in Rome, MACRO Future.

=== Breakthrough ===
In 2003, Hoppek left Berlin for Barcelona, Spain, which at the time attracted street artists from all over the world. There, he established a connection with Iguapop, the art gallery that was becoming the centre of the lowbrow and street art scene in Barcelona. In 2003, Iguapop hosted his first solo exhibition in Barcelona, called Sexo Extra Ordinario Ahora! Hoppek also became part of the ROJO network and collaborated with other Barcelona-based artists, including Miss Van. In 2006 Hoppek built a huge architectural structure from cardboard at the Bread & Butter fashion fair in Barcelona, one of his first such constructions and the basis for several similar projects over the following years, like a cardboard church front built for the 2010 edition of the Swab art fair in Barcelona.

=== The C'Mons ===
In 2005 Hoppek was approached by the advertising company DLKW, who wanted to create an advertising campaign for the Opel Corsa based on his own Bimbo dolls. For the campaign Hoppek created a new set of dolls, using elliptic instead of oval shapes in order to differentiate the new characters from the Bimbo dolls. The result are The C'Mons, Hoppek's fictional rock band that has been featured Europe-wide in TV, online and print ads since 2006. Moreover, together with other artists he was invited to redesign the Park Hotel in Copenhagen for the Volkswagen Fox.

=== Lavagina ===
Hoppek produces an irregular publication called Lavagina, an ironic take on a sex magazine. It started out as a catalogue for a 2007 exhibition at Heliumcowboy artspace in Hamburg, and has since evolved into a magazine featuring principally (but not exclusively) his own visual work and writing by others. Contributors include Dave the Chimp, two points studio and Andrew Losowsky.

=== 86 Negritos ===
In 2007 the town of Cádiz, in Andalusia, invited Hoppek to take over the Baluarte de la Candelaria cultural centre, located in an old fortress, for an exhibition. Hoppek turned it into an artistic protest highlighting the plight of illegal immigrants from the African continent. The exhibition included a boat filled with black men floating in the sea, imitating the rickety vessels often used by human traffickers, and interactive installations like a "Shoot the black" shooting range and a punching ball. The exhibition ended with a workshop for kids and was widely covered by Spanish media. It was eventually turned into an eponymous book published by Iguapop.

=== Pictoplasma ===
Boris Hoppek has strong ties to the Pictoplasma character design festival. He participated in Pictoplasma 1 and designed the poster for Pictoplasma 3, which took place in Berlin in 2009 and at which he was also listed as a speaker, although he never gave a talk himself.

== Selected solo exhibitions ==
- “Ever”, Diesel Gallery, Tokyo, Japan (2010)
- “The Hip”, Room 26, Rome, Italy (2010)
- “Group Love”, MACRO Future, Rome, Italy (2010)
- “Since 1989”, Since upian artspace, Paris, France (2009)
- “Popo”, heliumcowboy artspace, Hamburg, Germany (2009)
- “Fragil”, Iguapop Gallery, Barcelona, Spain (2008)
- “Mascherare”, Rojo artspace, Milan, Italy (2008)
- “86 Negritos”, Baluarte de la Candelaria, Cádiz, España (2007)
- “I wonʼt fuck with you tonight”, heliumcowboy artspace, Hamburg, Germany (2007)
- “Black Baby” Kubrick gallery, Las Palmas de Gran Canaria, Spain (2007)
- Cardboard city installation, Bread and Butter Fashion Fair, Barcelona, Spain (2006)
- “Boris Hoppek and Sancho Panza”, MAGMA gallery, Manchester, UK (2005)

== Selected group exhibitions ==
- Pictoplasma Festival, Berlin, Germany (2009)
- “True Self”, Jonathan LeVine Gallery, New York City, USA (2009)
- “Apocalypse Wow!”, MACRO Future, Rome, Italy (2009)
- “Das Herz von St. Pauli”, Iguapop Gallery, Barcelona, Spain (2009)
- “no new enemies”, Le Botanique, Brussels, Belgium (2008)
- “We love Asbaek”, Rojo artspace, Copenhagen, Denmark (2008)
- Fumetto International Comix Festival, Switzerland (2008)
- “Urban Superstars”, Museo D‘Arte Contemporanea Donna Regina, Naples, Italy (2008)
- Project FOX, Copenhagen, Denmark (2005)
- ROJO.gold collective, Stay Gold Gallery, San Francisco, USA (2005)
- Doodlebug street art festival, Manchester and London, UK (2004)
- "Xmas Panic", Galerie Revolver, Düsseldorf, Germany (2003)

== Publications ==
- Boris Hoppek, 86 Negritos. Iguapop, 2008.
- Boris Hoppek, Tranquilo. ROJO, 2007 (ISSN 1696-1692)
- Boris Hoppek y Sancho Panza. Die Gestalten, 2005. ISBN 978-3-89955-073-3
