= Diamond code =

Diamond code may refer to:

- Diamond code (genetics), a (wrong) proposal by George Gamow how to denote DNA sequences
- Diamond code (coding theory), a self-complementing arithmetic code in coding theory

== See also ==
- Canadian Diamond Code of Conduct
- Diamond (disambiguation)
