= Harry Diamond =

Harry Diamond may refer to:

- Harry Diamond (engineer) (1900–1948), American radio pioneer and inventor
- Harry Diamond (photographer) (1924–2009), British photographer
- Harry Diamond (politician) (1908–1996), Irish politician
- Harry Diamond (caddie), Northern Irish golf caddie for Rory McIlroy

== See also ==
- Harry Diamond Laboratories, a research facility of the National Bureau of Standards and later the U.S. Army
