= Wauba Debar =

Aboriginal Tasmanian

- Born: c. 1792
- Died: June 1832
- Burial place: Bicheno, Van Diemen's Land

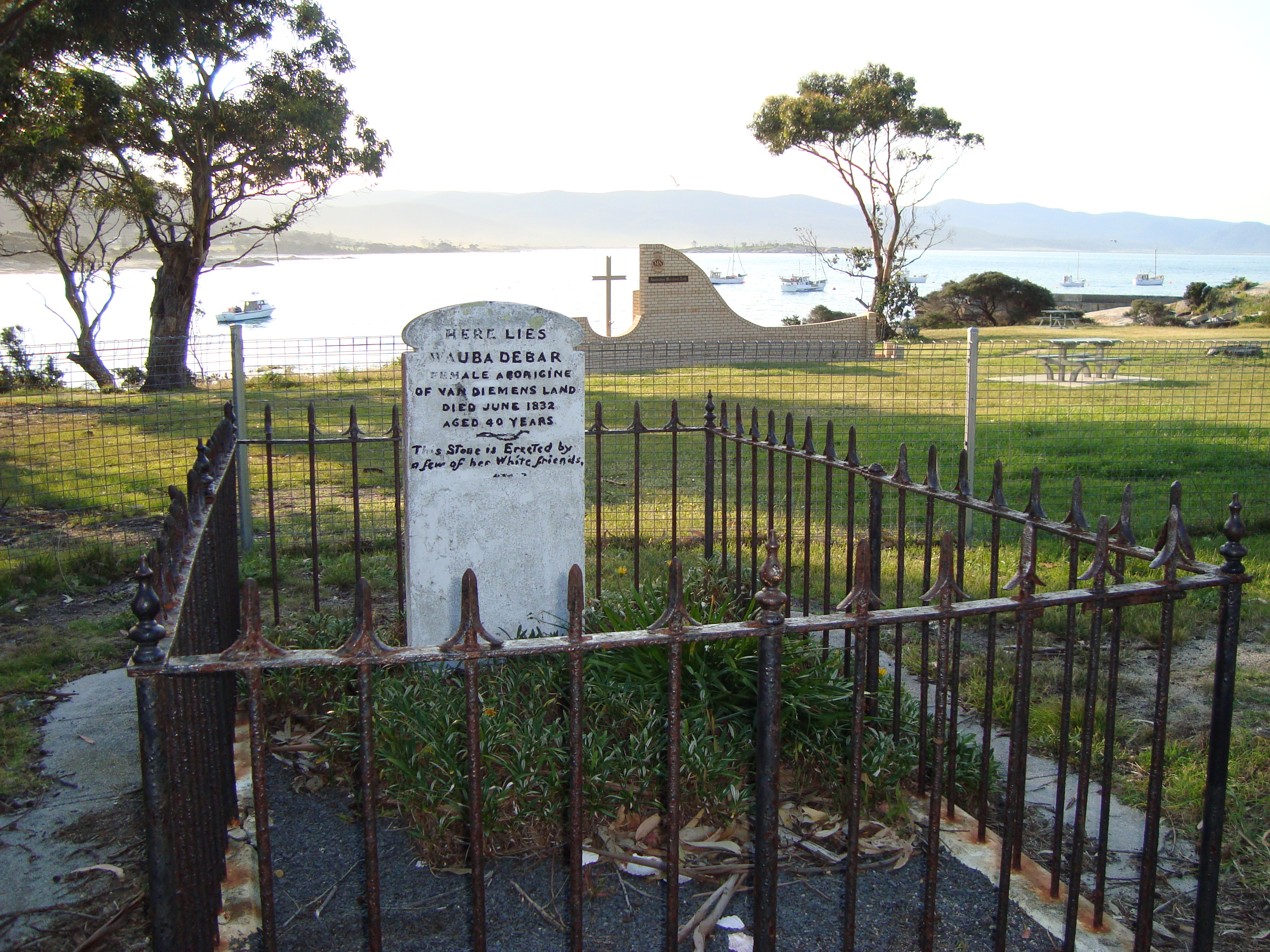
Wauba Debar's grave and headstone in Bicheno

Wauba Debar (c. 1792–1832) was a female Aboriginal Tasmanian. Her grave is a historic site located in the east coast Tasmanian town of Bicheno, which memorialises her rescue of two sealers, one of them her husband, when their ship was wrecked about 1 km from shore during a storm. She assisting first her husband, then the other sealer safely to shore.

The grave site overlooks Waubs Bay and Warbs Harbour both of which were named after her, and is listed on the Tasmanian Heritage list.

Wauba Debar, as a teenager, was one of many Aboriginal women kidnapped and enslaved by sealers and whalers for sexual partners during the European colonisation of Tasmania. She was a strong swimmer.

She died in a boat off the coast whilst travelling towards the Furneaux Group and her body was brought ashore and buried. Local settlers, including John Allen, raised funds in 1855 to erect the headstone on her grave, immortalising her act of heroism.

However, there are conflicting stories about the death and burial of Wauba Debar. In 1893, elderly Bicheno residents said Wauba was buried 10 years before the date on the headstone, placing her death around 1822.

In 1893, her body was exhumed by the Tasmanian Museum in Hobart, since aboriginal remains were becoming increasingly scarce. The local Municipal Council was aggrieved, but found that the law of the time gave no legal recourse, except perhaps for any clothes found with the body. The remains were reportedly forwarded to different places, with the skull in the museum in Hobart.

Her remains were returned to the Aboriginal community in 1985.
