= Harry Diamond (caddie) =

Irish golf caddie and golfer

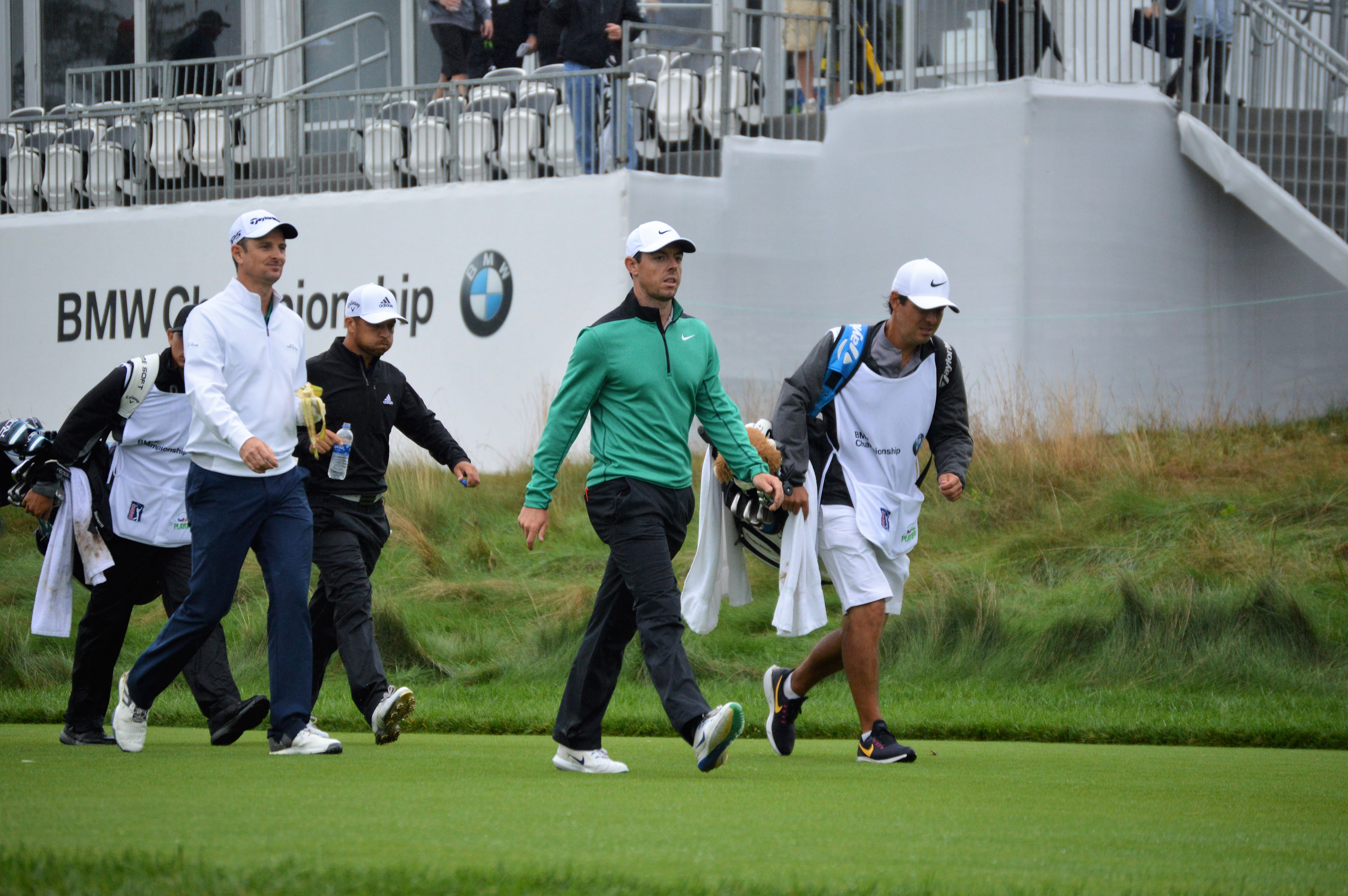
- Diamond holding the bag for McIlroy at the 2018 BMW Championship held at the Aronimink Golf Club in Newtown Square, Pennsylvania
- Born: Northern Ireland
- Occupation: Golf caddie
- Years active: 2017–present
- Known for: Longtime caddie for Rory McIlroy
- Children: 2

Harry Diamond is a Northern Irish professional golf caddie and former amateur golfer who has served as the caddie for Rory McIlroy since 2017.

== Early life and career ==
Diamond grew up in Holywood, Northern Ireland, and met McIlroy at Holywood Golf Club when they were both young children. Diamond was two years older and they spent years playing golf together. McIlroy considers him a big brother.

Diamond has competed in golf tournaments as an amateur. He won the 2012 West of Ireland Championship and represented Ireland at international level in golf. He reached the final of 2011 North of Ireland Championship. He did not pursue a career in professional golf and became involved in family run businesses (pubs, hotels, and restaurants) in Bangor, County Down and Belfast.

== Caddying career ==
Diamond caddied for McIlroy during the 2005 Irish Open (golf). He also caddied for him at the Par-3 Tournament at the 2011 Masters, and for the 2014 Alfred Dunhill Links Championship in Scotland. McIlroy and Diamond partnered professionally in 2017 before the WGC-Bridgestone Invitational. Before Diamond, J.P. Fitzgerald was McIlroy's caddie. McIlroy switched because he was hard on Fitzgerald and wanted to take ownership of his game.

Diamond's caddying style has been characterized as quiet and composed, and aiming to keep McIlroy focused under pressure. McIlroy has said that Diamond provides a level of comfort on the golf course that no one else could. In May 2021, McIlroy credited Diamond with advice that helped him win the Wells Fargo Championship on the 72nd hole. However, Diamond faced criticism for McIlroy's lack of victories at major championships. He was criticized for McIlroy's collapse at the 2024 U.S. Open (golf).

McIlroy later won two majors. At the 2025 Masters Tournament, McIlroy won in a sudden-death playoff to complete the career Grand Slam, and credited Diamond. After the win, he said: "To be able to share this with him after all the close calls that we've had, all the crap that he's had to take from people that don't know anything about the game, yeah, this one is just as much his as it is mine." He went on to win the 2026 Masters Tournament with Diamond.

Diamond rarely grants interviews to the news media. He gave a short, live TV interview at the 2025 Open Championship with Di Stewart on "Live at the Range."

== Personal life ==
Diamond is married. The couple have two children.
