= William Dymond =

British flying ace of WWII

- Born: 11 November 1917; Twickenham, Middlesex, United Kingdom
- Died: 2 September 1940 (aged 22) †; Thames Estuary, United Kingdom
- Military career
- Allegiance: United Kingdom
- Branch: Royal Air Force
- Rank: Sergeant Pilot
- Unit: No. 111 Squadron
- Conflicts: Second World War: Battle of France; Battle of Britain
- Awards: Distinguished Flying Medal

William Dymond, DFM (11 November 1917 – 2 September 1940) was a flying ace who served in the Royal Air Force (RAF) during the Second World War. During his service with the RAF, he was credited with having destroyed at least ten German aircraft

Born in Twickenham, Dymond joined the RAF in 1935. Posted to No. 111 Squadron the following year after his training was completed, he was a sergeant pilot at the time of the outbreak of the Second World War. He flew Hawker Hurricane fighters extensively during the Battle of France and the following aerial campaign over southeast England. He was killed in action on 2 September 1940, when he was shot down over the Thames Estuary, aged 22. An award of the Distinguished Flying Medal was announced after his death.

== Early life ==
William Lawrence Dymond was born at Twickenham in Middlesex, the United Kingdom, on 11 November 1917 to Thomas and Kathleen Dymond. He was a student at Richmond County School in Surrey and once his education was completed, he applied to join the Royal Air Force as an airman pilot. Accepted on a provisional basis in September 1935, he initially attended No. 3 Civil Flying Training School at Hamble.

Successfully completing this phase of training, Dymond was formally accepted into the RAF in January 1936. In August, having completed his pilot training at No. 10 Flying Training School at Ternhill, Dymond was posted to No. 111 Squadron as a sergeant pilot. His new unit was stationed at Northolt and equipped with the Gloster Gauntlet biplane fighter but was then the first squadron to receive the Hawker Hurricane fighter.

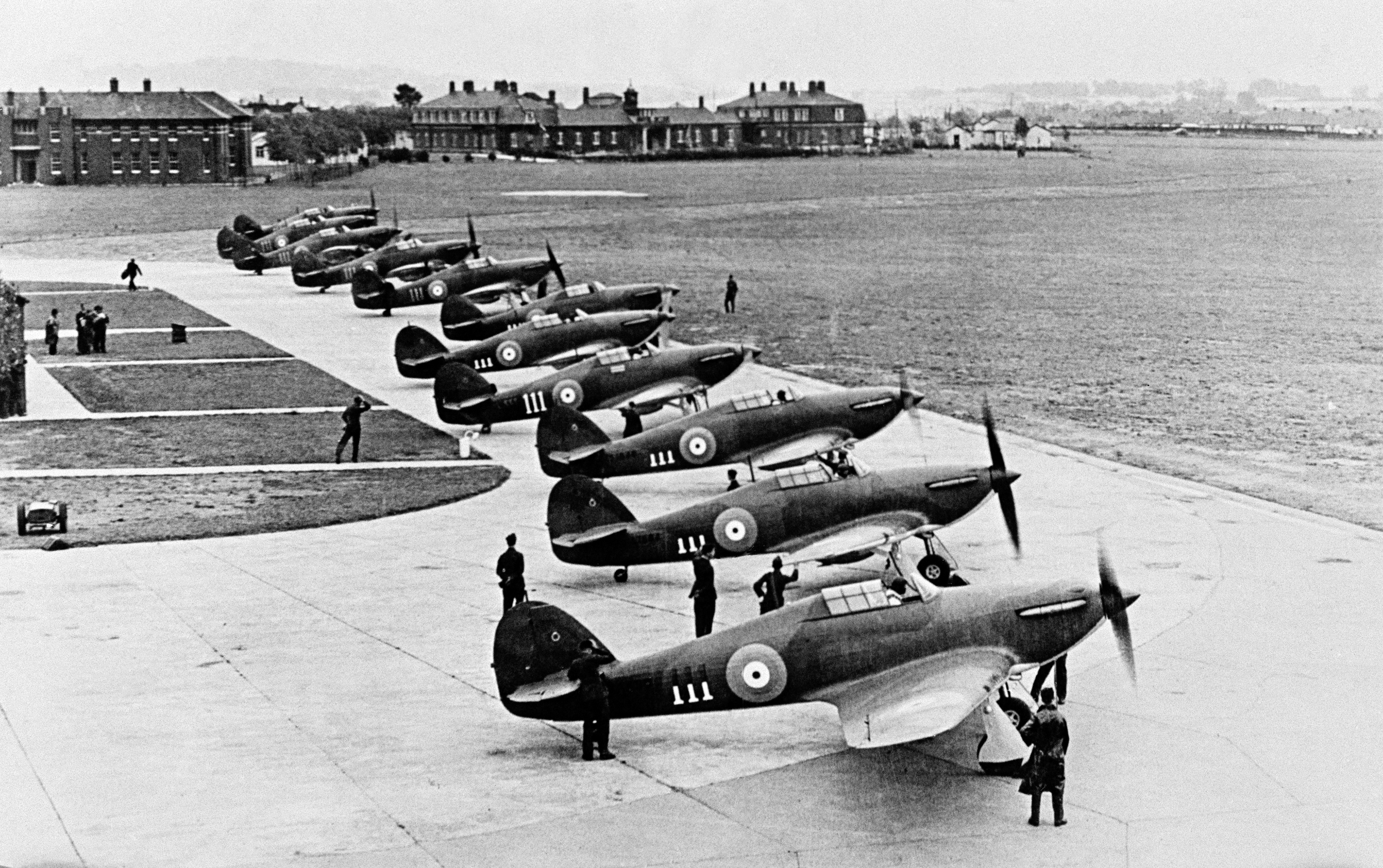
Hawker Hurricanes of No. 111 Squadron at Northolt, 1938

== Second World War ==
Shortly after the outbreak of the Second World War, No. 111 Squadron moved north, initially to Acklington and then to Drem in Scotland, from where it patrolled along the coastline. In February 1940, the squadron shifted again, this time to Wick, where it provided the Royal Navy base at Scapa Flow with aerial cover. It was occasionally scrambled to counter Luftwaffe bomber attacks on Scapa Flow. On 10 April, Dymond shared in the destruction of a Heinkel He 111 medium bomber of Kampfgeschwader 26 (Bomber Wing 26).

=== Battle of France ===
By mid-May, No. 111 Squadron was back in the south of England, from where it regularly flew to France following the invasion of that country. On 18 May Dymond destroyed a pair of Dornier Do 17 medium bombers in the vicinity of Bailleul. At the end of the month and into early June, No. 111 Squadron flew in support of Operation Dynamo, the evacuation of the British Expeditionary Force from Dunkirk. During this time, Dymond shot down two He 111s to the northwest of Dunkirk. Once the evacuation was completed, the squadron provided escorts for the Fleet Air Arm's bombing operations over the French coast and on 11 June, Dymond destroyed a Messerschmitt Bf 109 fighter over Le Havre.

=== Battle of Britain ===
Following a period of rest so it could train up replacement pilots, No. 111 Squadron, now based at Croydon, commenced patrolling over the English Channel and then became drawn into the aerial fighting over the southeast of England during the Battle of Britain. Dymond destroyed a Do 17 over Eastchurch on 13 August, and also claimed a second as damaged in the same area. His Hurricane was damaged in the engagement. Two days later, he destroyed another Do 17 about 10 miles (16 km) from Detling, also damaging another of the same type. His Hurricane received return machine-gun fire from the Do 17s, and due to the resulting damage, he had to land at West Malling. Later the same day, to the north of Redhill, he shot down a Messerschmitt Bf 110 heavy fighter; he damaged two more over Croydon. He claimed a Do 17 as damaged over West Malling on 16 August.

In the early afternoon of 18 August, on what became known as the Hardest Day, No. 111 Squadron was scrambled to protect the airfield at Kenley, the target of a large Luftwaffe bombing raid. Dymond destroyed one Do 17 and damaged a second over Kenley. The next day, the squadron, reduced to nine pilots following its intensive operations of the past several days, relocated to Debden for a two-week period. Dymond shot down a He 111 to the west of Chelmsford on 24 August and damaged a Bf 110 at the end of the month over the Thames Estuary. His successes during August saw him interviewed by the British Broadcasting Corporation for radio.

On 2 September, Dymond was flying over the Thames Estuary when he was shot down and killed, his Hurricane going into the sea. Four days after his death, it was announced that Dymond was awarded the Distinguished Flying Medal. The published citation read:

Since May, 1940, this airman pilot has accompanied his squadron on nearly all offensive patrols over France, and its engagements over this country. During this period he has shot down eight enemy aircraft, and probably destroyed a further three. Sergeant Dymond has displayed a fine fighting spirit.

— London Gazette, No. 34940, 6 September 1940

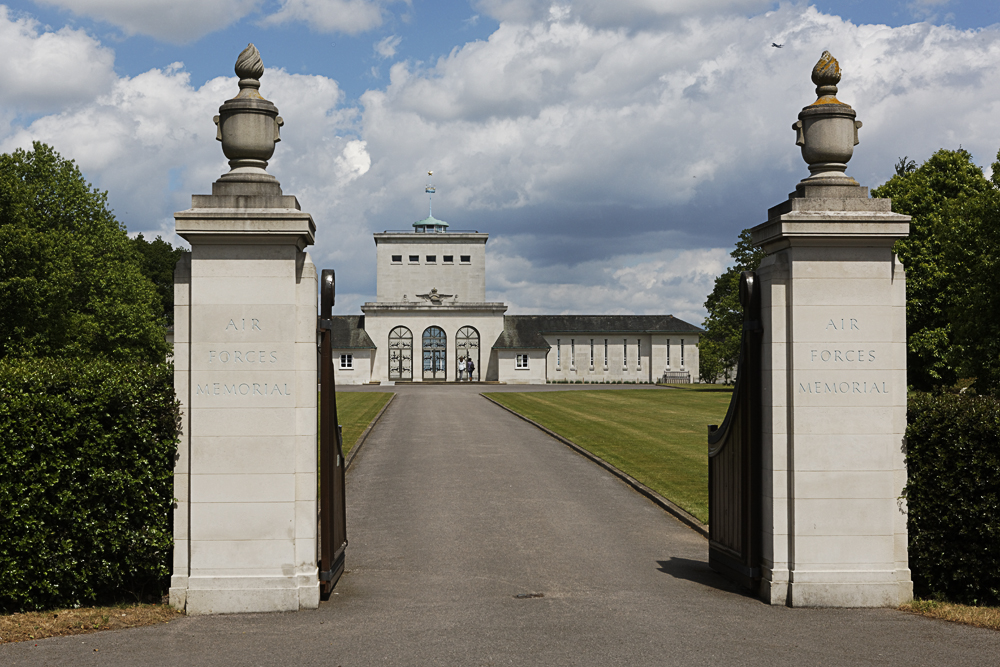
The Air Forces Memorial, near Egham in England, where Dymond is commemorated

Dymond is credited with having shot down ten German aircraft, with a share in an eleventh. He is also credited with one aircraft probably destroyed and six damaged. Survived by his wife Joan, who he had married in 1939, Dymond has no known grave. He is commemorated on the Commonwealth War Graves Commission's Air Forces Memorial near Egham in Surrey.
