= La Grande Princesse, U.S. Virgin Islands =

Coordinates: 17°45′27″N 64°44′11″W

La Grande Princesse, United States Virgin Islands
- Village
- Interactive map of La Grande Princesse, United States Virgin Islands
- Country: United States Virgin Islands
- Island: Saint Croix
- Time zone: UTC-4 (AST)

La Grande Princesse is a settlement on the island of Saint Croix in the United States Virgin Islands.
