= Bicheno, Tasmania =

Bicheno
- Town
- Coordinates: 41°52′S 148°17′E
- Country: Australia
- State: Tasmania
- LGA: Glamorgan Spring Bay Council
- Location: 37 km (23 mi) from Coles Bay; 43 km (27 mi) from Swansea; 44 km (27 mi) from St Marys; 106 km (66 mi) from Campbell Town

Government
  - State electorate: Lyons
  - Federal division: Lyons

Area
  - Total: 151.1 km^{2} (58.3 sq mi)

Population
  - Total: 943 (2016 census)
  - Density: 5.6/km^{2} (15/sq mi)
- Postcode: 7215
- {{{blank_name_sec2}}}: 17.9 °C (64.2 °F)
- {{{blank1_name_sec2}}}: 9.5 °C (49.1 °F)
- {{{blank2_name_sec2}}}: 678.8 mm (26.72 in)

Bicheno /ˈbɪʃɛnoʊ/ is a locality and town on the east coast of Tasmania, Australia, 185 km north-east of Hobart on the Tasman Highway, with a population of around 950. It is part of the municipality of Glamorgan-Spring Bay. The town is primarily a fishing port and a beach resort.

== History ==
The town was named in honour of James Ebenezer Bicheno, the British Colonial Secretary for Van Diemen's Land from 1843 to 1851, with the name in use in 1851.

The first historical reference to the place that was to become Bicheno was made by James Kelly during his circumnavigation of Van Diemen's Land. He landed here (when it was known as Waubs Harbour) to dry his provisions.

Waub's Harbour was the location for a number of shore-based bay whaling stations in the late 1830s and early 1840s.

Bicheno was proclaimed a township in 1866. Bicheno Post Office opened as a receiving house on 1 January 1855.

== Features ==
In Lions Park near the tennis courts is the grave of Wauba Debar (after whom Waub's Harbour was named), an Aboriginal woman who was stolen from her tribe as a teenager to become a "sealer's woman". Her bravery in rescuing two sealers in a storm is commemorated by a headstone.

The hinterland was established for farming in the mid-1840s, which continues today. Coal was discovered in 1848. In 1854, the harbour was expanded to provide port facilities for the coal mines at Denison River. The coal was transported to the port via a 5‑km horse-drawn tramway. Coal can still be seen in this area today.

The use of Bicheno as a coal port was short-lived. The discovery of gold in Victoria saw most of the residents depart in 1855 and for nearly a century, Bicheno became a sleepy little fishing village. Fishing has continued to be the lifeblood of the town with substantial quantities of crayfish, abalone, scallops and trevally. Many tourists enjoy fish and chips at the waterfront near the boat ramp. In recent times it has become a popular tourist destination, with a range of accommodation, a few craft shops, and cafes. Visitors are also attracted to the little penguin colony on adjacent Diamond Island. Visitors to the penguins are reminded to respect these wild animals. There is the option to do a guided penguin tour to a protected rookery. The area is a popular picnic spot and the home of Pop Up Picnic Bicheno. There are many vineyards surrounding Bicheno. Wines from all local vineyards can be tasted at The Farm Shed, a new staple in the town. A nearby point of interest is the Bicheno Blowhole. A famous resident is the world champion swimmer Shane Gould. Famous artists include painter Vanessa Richardson, surf photographer Mathew Tildesley and contemporary jeweller Carl Noonan. A cold water swim group meet each morning at Waubs Bay, regardless of weather or season.

In September 2003, a memorial to the merchant navy was unveiled in Bicheno. Five months later, in February 2004, the town presented a freedom of entry charter to the Australian Merchant Navy, the first time any locality in the world has granted "freedom of the city" to the merchant navy. Local primary school children have been appointed custodians of the memorial, built near Wauba Debar's grave.

At the 2025 Australian federal election the Bicheno booth recorded the following number of votes for each party: Labor 199 (41.12%), Liberal 108 (22.31%), Greens 95 (19.63%), Pauline Hanson's One Nation 24 (4.96%), Trumpet of Patriots 21 (4.34%), Shooters, Fishers and Farmers Party 18 (3.72%), independent Angela Offord 16 (3.31%) and Citizens Party 3 (0.62%) After the distribution of preferences the two-party preferred vote was Labor 317 (64.46%) to Liberal 172 (35.54%).

Bicheno is part of the Glamorgan Spring Bay Council.

== Population ==
In the 2016 Census, there were 943 people in Bicheno. 76.6% of people were born in Australia and 86.0% of people only spoke English at home. The most common responses for religion were No Religion 37.7% and Anglican 23.7%.

== Climate ==
Bicheno has a temperate oceanic climate (Köppen climate classification: Cfb) with mild summers and winters. The record high of 38.9 °C (102.0 °F) was recorded on 31 January 1968, and the record low of −0.6 °C (30.9 °F) was recorded on 15 July 1966.

Climate data for Bicheno (Council Depot) (11 m AMSL)
| Month | Jan | Feb | Mar | Apr | May | Jun | Jul | Aug | Sep | Oct | Nov | Dec | Year |
|---|---|---|---|---|---|---|---|---|---|---|---|---|---|
| Record high °C (°F) | 38.9 (102.0) | 37.8 (100.0) | 35.4 (95.7) | 30.6 (87.1) | 26.7 (80.1) | 21.1 (70.0) | 19.4 (66.9) | 23.2 (73.8) | 30.6 (87.1) | 31.4 (88.5) | 35.1 (95.2) | 36.9 (98.4) | 38.9 (102.0) |
| Mean daily maximum °C (°F) | 21.6 (70.9) | 21.5 (70.7) | 20.6 (69.1) | 18.9 (66.0) | 16.6 (61.9) | 14.6 (58.3) | 14.1 (57.4) | 14.7 (58.5) | 16.2 (61.2) | 17.5 (63.5) | 18.5 (65.3) | 20.1 (68.2) | 17.9 (64.2) |
| Mean daily minimum °C (°F) | 13.1 (55.6) | 13.2 (55.8) | 12.2 (54.0) | 10.2 (50.4) | 8.5 (47.3) | 6.7 (44.1) | 6.1 (43.0) | 6.4 (43.5) | 7.4 (45.3) | 8.6 (47.5) | 10.3 (50.5) | 11.7 (53.1) | 9.5 (49.1) |
| Record low °C (°F) | 5.0 (41.0) | 6.5 (43.7) | 3.0 (37.4) | 2.0 (35.6) | 0.9 (33.6) | −0.5 (31.1) | −0.6 (30.9) | 0.7 (33.3) | 0.4 (32.7) | 0.7 (33.3) | 1.2 (34.2) | 2.2 (36.0) | −0.6 (30.9) |
| Average rainfall mm (inches) | 54.0 (2.13) | 57.4 (2.26) | 57.2 (2.25) | 56.8 (2.24) | 55.4 (2.18) | 62.0 (2.44) | 50.9 (2.00) | 51.1 (2.01) | 43.8 (1.72) | 54.7 (2.15) | 61.8 (2.43) | 67.9 (2.67) | 679.6 (26.76) |
| Average rainy days (≥ 0.2 mm) | 8.2 | 8.3 | 8.3 | 9.0 | 9.1 | 9.6 | 9.3 | 9.9 | 9.0 | 10.3 | 10.5 | 10.0 | 111.5 |
Source: Bureau of Meteorology

== Gallery ==
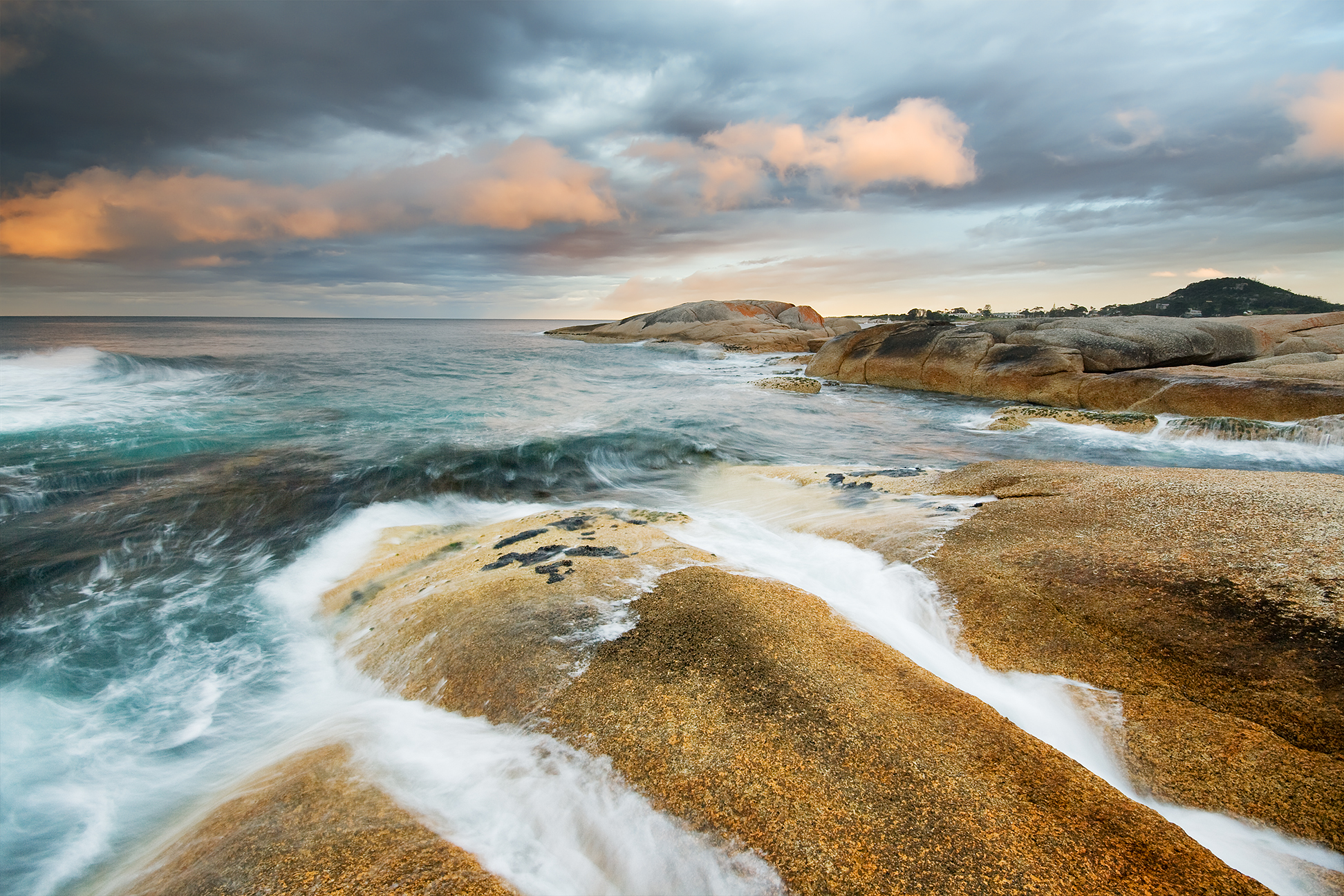
Red lichen gives these rocks a red colour, just north of Bicheno; the town of Bicheno can be seen on the far right

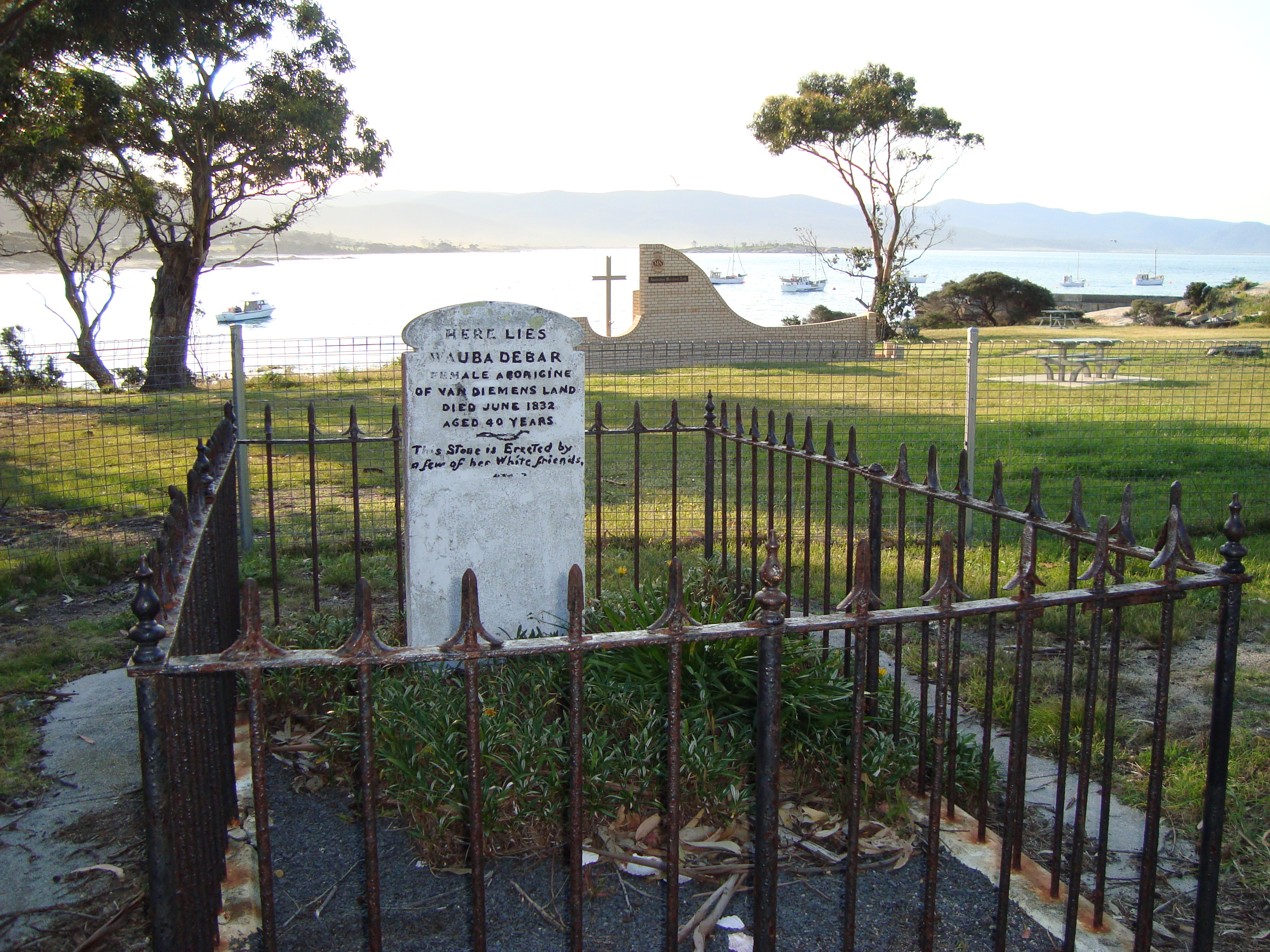
Wauba Debar's grave and headstone

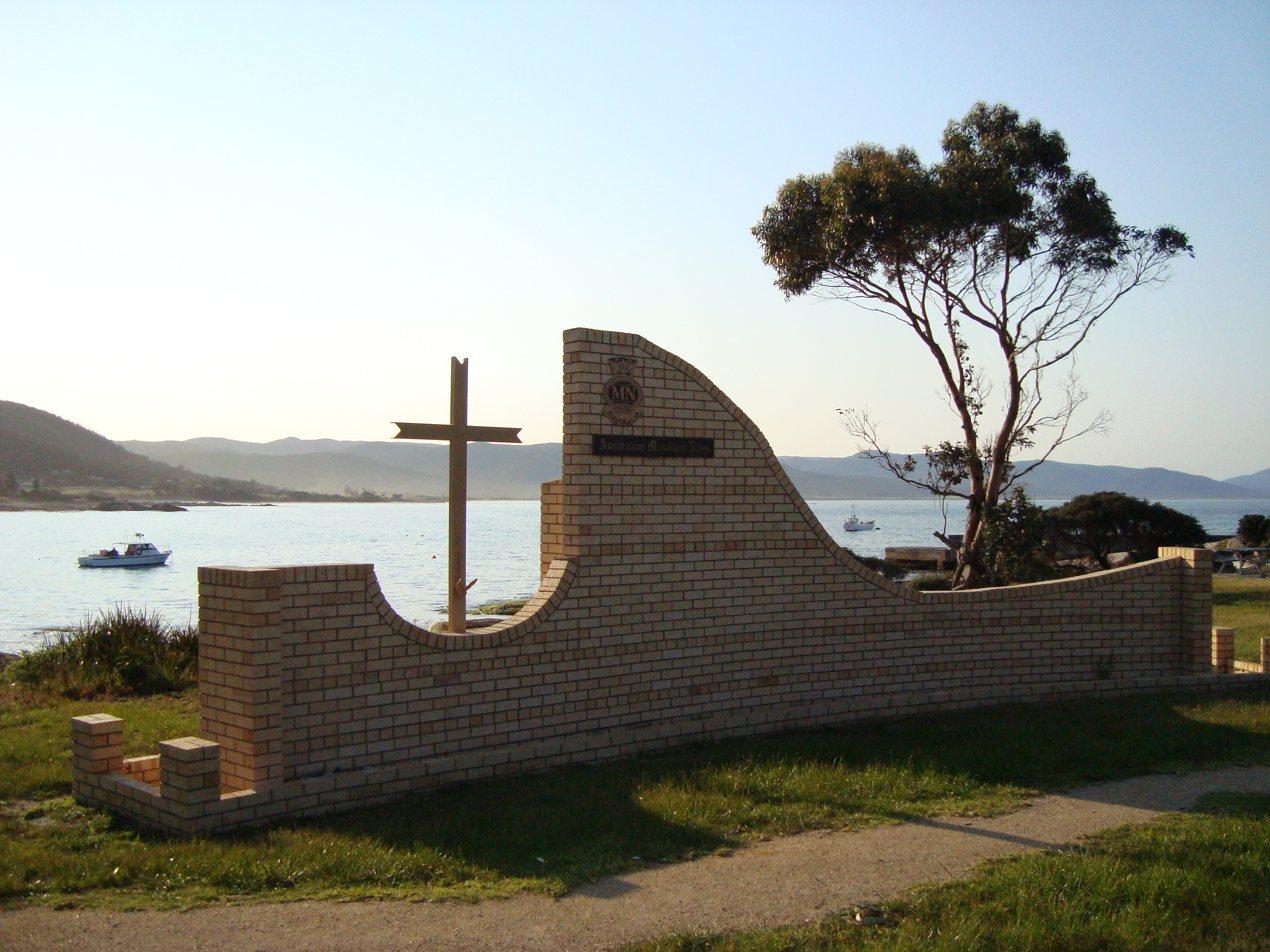
Merchant Navy memorial
