= Diamond, Louisiana =

- Unincorporated community
- Location within Louisiana Location within the United States
- Coordinates: 29°32′08″N 89°45′43″W
- Country: United States
- State: Louisiana
- Parish: Plaquemines
- Elevation: 3 ft (0.91 m)
- Time zone: UTC-6 (Central (CST))
  - Summer (DST): UTC-5 (CDT)
- Area code: 504
- GNIS feature ID: 543144

Diamond is an unincorporated community in Plaquemines Parish, Louisiana, United States.
