= Diamond Lake (Kandiyohi County, Minnesota) =

Lake in the state of Minnesota, United States

- Location within Minnesota
- Location: Kandiyohi County, Minnesota
- Coordinates: 45°11′01″N 94°50′29″W
- Type: Lake
- Surface elevation: 1,171 feet (357 m)

Diamond Lake is a lake in Kandiyohi County, in the U.S. state of Minnesota.

Diamond Lake was so named for its clear and sparkling waters.

== See also ==
- List of lakes in Minnesota
