= Diamond (dog) =

Dog said to have been owned by Sir Isaac Newton

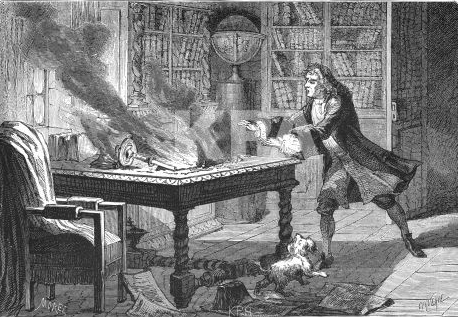
An 1874 engraving showing the probably apocryphal account of Newton's lab fire.

Diamond was, according to legend, Sir Isaac Newton's favourite dog, who, by upsetting a candle, set fire to manuscripts containing his notes on experiments conducted over the course of twenty years. According to one account, Newton is said to have exclaimed: "O Diamond, Diamond, thou little knowest the mischief thou hast done." The story is largely apocryphal: according to another account, Newton simply left a window open when he went to church, and the candle was knocked over by a gust of wind. Some historians claim that Newton never owned pets.

The story of "Newton's Mischief" has been reproduced over the centuries as early as 1833 in "The Life of Sir Isaac Newton" by David Brewster and later in St. Nicholas Magazine. In 1816 Walter Scott used the story in the third of his Waverley Novels, The Antiquary (volume 2, chapter 1).

This pet of Newton's was also mentioned in Thomas Carlyle's book The French Revolution: A History, employed in discussing the deathbed of Louis XV. Carlyle writes "To the eye of History many things, in that sick room of Louis, are now visible, which to the courtiers there present were invisible. For indeed it has been well said, 'in every object there is inexhaustible meaning; the eye sees in it what the eye brings means of seeing.' To Newton and to Newton's dog Diamond, what a different pair of Universes; while the painting on the optical retina of both was, most likely, the same!"

Nevertheless, Diamond is the subject of several anecdotes concerning Newton. In another tale, Newton is said to have claimed that the dog discovered two theorems in a single morning. He added, however, that "one had a mistake and the other had a pathological exception."

== See also ==
- List of individual dogs
