= Andrew Diamond =

Stage name for American reggae artist Andrew Seidel

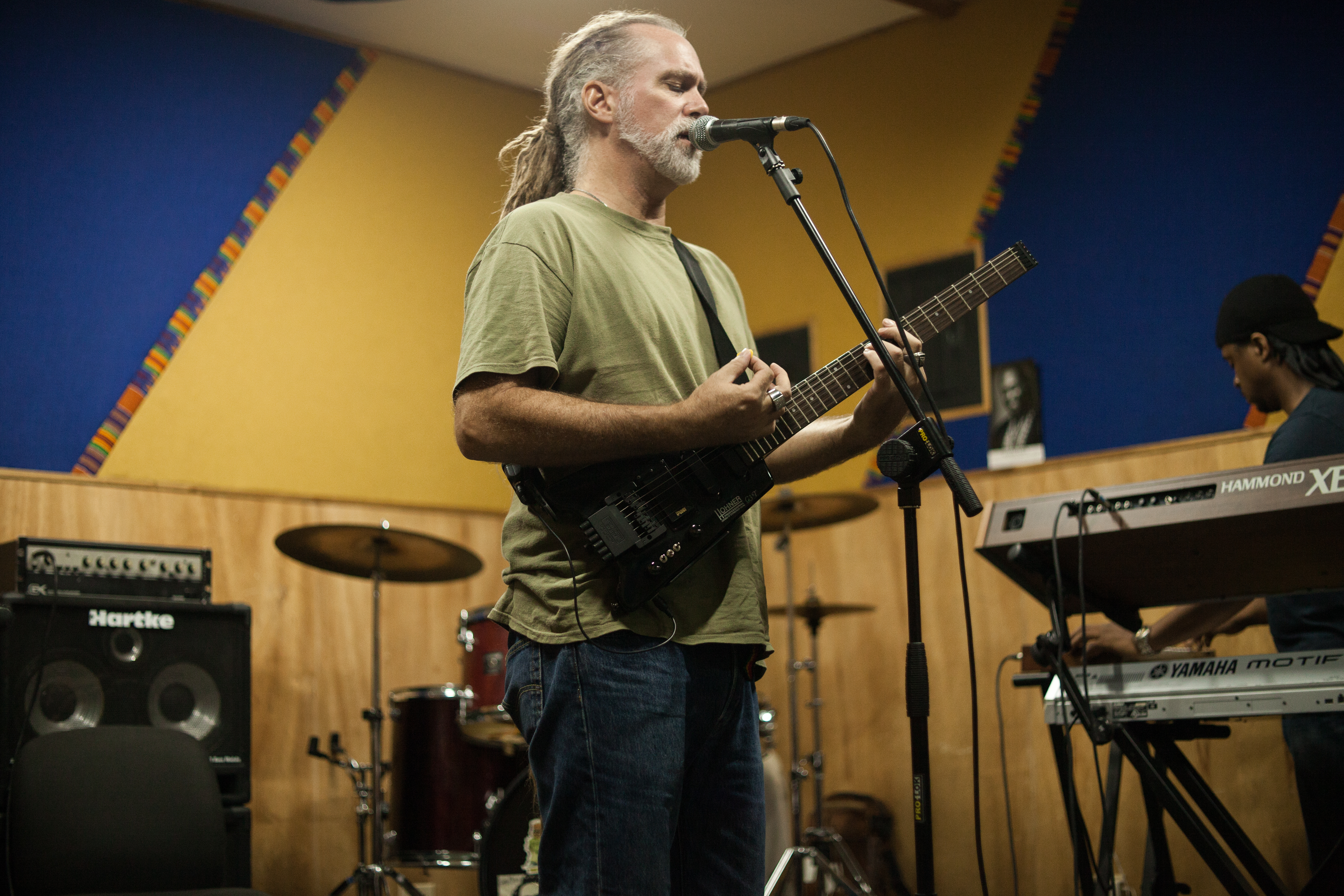
- Andrew Diamond in rehearsal, Kingston Jamaica 2016

Background information
- Born: Andrew Seidel; 19 June 1969 (age 57); Stanford, California, U.S.
- Genres: Reggae
- Occupations: Singer-Songwriter, Multi-instrumentalist, Record Producer
- Instruments: Vocals, drums, keyboards, guitar
- Years active: 1992 - present
- Label: SUB80
- Website: www.andrewdiamond.com

Andrew Seidel (born June 19, 1969, Stanford, California) better known as by his stage name Andrew Diamond is an American reggae artist and music producer.

== Career ==
Originally a drummer, Andrew also sings, plays keyboards, and guitar, he also writes, produces and mixes music for other artists. In 1995 he performed with the Itals and was invited by singer David Isaacs to visit and record in Jamaica. In 2000, Andrew founded the Solid Foundation Band to support Jamaican reggae artist Winston Jarrett for a US tour. In the years following the Solid Foundation Band also supported reggae artists: the Ethiopian, Tony Rebel, Queen Ifrica, Richie Spice, Norrisman, Everton Blender and Prezident Brown. In 2001 Andrew was introduced to Bay Area Rapper E-40 and became one of his personal recording engineers. In 2004 Andrew moved to Jamaica where he became the Resident Engineer at the Geejam recording studio in Port Antonio. In 2007, he released his first solo album, Diamond in the Rough and was given the "Top 10 Reggae Albums of 2007" award from ReggaeTrade Radio. From 2010 to 2015 Andrew lived in Lusaka, Zambia where he recorded traditional African music as well as mixed the, Mecoustic album by Tarrus Riley. In 2015 he returned to Kingston, Jamaica where he works from his private recording studio.

== Discography ==
- Diamond in the Rough (2007), SUB80
