= Golden Grove, U.S. Virgin Islands =

Coordinates: 17°42′56″N 64°48′04″W

Golden Grove, United States Virgin Islands
- Village
- Interactive map of Golden Grove, United States Virgin Islands
- Country: United States Virgin Islands
- Island: Saint Croix
- Time zone: UTC-4 (AST)

Golden Grove is a settlement on the island of Saint Croix in the United States Virgin Islands.
