= Science (1829 ship) =

British ship sunk off Cape Horn in 1832

History

United Kingdom
- Name: Science
- Owner: Tindall, Scarborough
- Builder: Tindall, Scarborough
- Launched: 4 May 1829
- Fate: Foundered and burnt June 1832

General characteristics
- Tons burthen: 232, or 234, or 250 (bm)
- Sail plan: Brig

Science was launched at Scarborough in 1829. On 20 September Captain J. Saunders sailed her from England for Mauritius under a license from the British East India Company. On 9 September 1831 Captain W. Saunders sailed her from Britain to Van Diemen's Land. She sailed from Hobart in May 1832.

Science, Saunders, master, foundered off Cape Horn, Chile on 21 June, after having been badly damaged by heavy seas at 56°S 125°W. Her crew set her on fire and abandoned her. The American South Sea whaler Warren rescued the crew. (Note: Warren, of 383 tons (bm), William Mayhew, Jr., master, had been launched in 1829 at Swansea, Massachusetts. She had left on a whaling voyage on 8 November 1830.) Science was on a voyage from Van Diemen's Land to London.

== See also ==
- John Allen (settler)
