= Diamond Lake (Idaho) =

Alpine lake in the state of Idaho

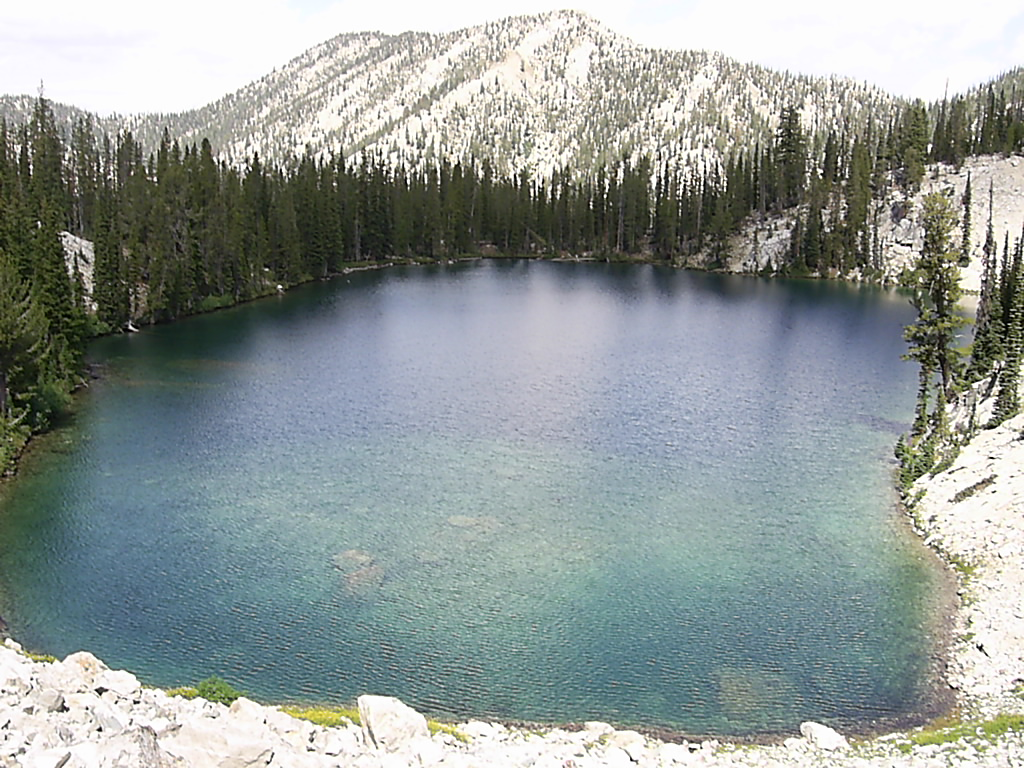

- Location within Idaho Location within the United States
- Location: Elmore County, Idaho
- Coordinates: 43°55′38″N 115°09′19″W
- Lake type: Glacial
- Primary outflows: Little Queens River to Middle Fork Boise River
- Basin countries: United States
- Max. length: 0.16 mi (0.26 km)
- Max. width: 0.09 mi (0.14 km)
- Surface elevation: 8,075 ft (2,461 m)

Diamond Lake is a small alpine lake in Elmore County, Idaho, United States, located in the Sawtooth Mountains in the Sawtooth National Recreation Area. The lake is accessed from Sawtooth National Forest trail 454 along the Little Queens River.

Diamond Lake is in the Sawtooth Wilderness, and a wilderness permit can be obtained at a registration box at trailheads or wilderness boundaries. Triangle Lake is 0.15 mi (0.24 km) east of Diamond Lake, although over a ridge and in a separate sub-basin.

== See also ==
- List of lakes of the Sawtooth Mountains (Idaho)
- Sawtooth National Forest
- Sawtooth National Recreation Area
- Sawtooth Range (Idaho)
