= Diamant (surname) =

Diamant is an Ashkenazi Jewish occupational name, meaning diamond.

== People with the name ==
- Alfred Diamant (1917–2012), American political scientist
- André Diamant (born 1990), Brazilian chess player
- Anita Diamant (born 1951), American author
- Dora Diamant (1898–1952), Polish teacher and actress associated with Franz Kafka
- Henri Diamant-Berger (1895–1972), French filmmaker
- Illana Diamant (born 1961), Israeli actress and activist
- József Diamant (1892–1975), Hungarian-born writer, also known as Joseph Bard
- Liron Diamant (born 1990), Israeli footballer
- Ruth Witt-Diamant (fl. 1931–1954), American poet and educator

== See also ==
- Diamant (disambiguation)
