= Rattan and Belvedere, U.S. Virgin Islands =

Rattan and Belvedere, United States Virgin Islands
- Village
- Location within the U.S. Virgin Islands
- Coordinates: 17°45′07″N 64°45′10″W
- Country: United States Virgin Islands
- Island: Saint Croix
- Elevation: 489 ft (149 m)
- Time zone: UTC-4 (AST)

Rattan and Belvedere is a settlement on the island of Saint Croix in the United States Virgin Islands.
