= Andrew Diamond (professor) =

American historian (born 1967)

- Born: Andrew Jay Diamond; November 1, 1967 (age 59); Boston, Massachusetts, U.S.
- Occupations: Historian; academic

Academic background
- Education: Tufts University; University of Michigan (PhD)

Andrew Jay Diamond (born November 1, 1967) is an American academic and professor of United States history at Sorbonne University, where he directs the research center Histoire et dynamique des espaces anglophones.

== Early life and education ==
Diamond was born in Boston in 1967 and raised in Needham, Massachusetts. He attended Tufts University from 1986 to 1990, where he majored in history and English. He obtained his PhD in history from the University of Michigan in Ann Arbor in 2004 with a doctoral dissertation entitled "Hoodlums, Rebels, and Vice lords: Street Gangs, Youth Subcultures, and Race in Chicago, 1919-1968." His doctoral research earned him a fellowship from the Harry Frank Guggenheim Foundation.

== Career ==
Diamond began his academic career in France in 2002 as a lecturer in American civilization at the Université de Picardie – Jules Verne and then moved on to the Université de Lille 3 in 2005, where he worked as an Assistant Professor until 2010. Between 2010 and 2012, Diamond was a full research fellow at the Centre d'Etudes et de Recherches Internationales (CERI) at Sciences Po - Paris. In 2012, he obtained his current position at the Sorbonne.

Diamond has been a member of the editorial boards of the Revue française d'études américaines and The Sixties: A Journal of History, Politics and Culture, and served on the board of directors of the Urban History Association and the Fulbright Commission in France. He has been a featured speaker for the African Regional Services of the United States Department of State, the United States Embassy in Paris, and the Consulate General of France in Chicago. He worked with the Institut Français of the French Ministry of Foreign Affairs as curator of "City/Cité: A Transatlantic Exchange". He has written on issues of race and inequality in France and the United States.

== Works ==
Diamond's first monograph, Mean Streets: Chicago Youths and the Everyday Struggle for Empowerment in the Multiracial City, 1908-1969, provides a comprehensive history of Chicago's youth subcultures and street gangs and their connection to racial identity formation and grassroots racial politics. Historian Perry Duis praised it as "an enormously important book for historians in several fields," and the Chicago Reader called it "a fascinating and revealing narrative." His most recent monograph, Chicago on the Make: Power and Inequality in a Modern City explores the "link between race and neoliberalization at Chicago's grassroots over the 20th century". The book was awarded the Jon Gjerde Prize for the best book in Midwestern history in 2017 and the Illinois State Historical Society's Award of Superior Achievement, and was featured in the New York Times. Chicago anti-racist punk band Race Traitor referred to it as a "full take down of the neoliberal politics of Chicago," and the Chicago Review asserted that "no one seems to come out unscathed from Diamond’ s historical overview, and finishing the book, regardless of political orientation or preference, leaves one with the feeling of having just unfurled a scroll coated in an uncomfortable film of grease."

== Accusations of professional misconduct and exoneration ==
In spring 2019, the French independent investigation media Mediapart echoed a doctoral student's complaint of harassment against Diamond, in a dossier compiled by the Clasches association with testimonies from seven people (six women and one man, the latter as a witness in support of his colleague). When contacted by Mediapart, Diamond rejected the accusations, which he claims were "unfounded ". After an appeal by the President of Sorbonne University to the relevant administrative jurisdiction, the Conseil national de l'enseignement supérieur et de la recherche (CNESER) confirmed on October 19, 2022 the decision of the disciplinary committee, stating that Diamond had committed no punishable fault and should be totally exonerated. The administrative court of Paris also ruled on January 6, 2023 in favor of Diamond, and ordered Sorbonne Université to grant him legal aid for suing those who had made false accusations against him.

== Major publications ==
- Diamond, Andrew, J., Mean Streets: Chicago Youths and the Everyday Struggle for Empowerment in the Multiracial City, 1908-1969 (Berkeley and Los Angeles: University of California Press, 2009)
- Diamond, Andrew and Pap Ndiaye, Histoire de Chicago (Paris: Fayard, 2013)
- Diamond, Andrew J., Chicago on the Make: Power and Inequality in a Modern City (Oakland: University of California Press, 2017)
- Diamond, Andrew J. and Thomas J. Sugrue, eds., Neoliberal Cities: The Remaking of Postwar Urban America (New York: New York University Press, 2020)
