= John Roberson Diamond =

- Born: May 14, 1820; DeKalb County, Georgia, US
- Died: January 9, 1880 (aged 59); Grayson County, Texas, US
- Military career
- Allegiance: Confederate States
- Branch: Confederate States Army
- Rank: Lieutenant colonel
- Battles: American Civil War

John Roberson Diamond (May 14, 1820 – January 9, 1880) was a Confederate cavalry officer, rising to become lieutenant colonel in James G. Bourland's "Border Regiment", which was tasked with protecting the northern border of Texas during the American Civil War. He was also an active Freemason and Odd Fellow in Grayson County, Texas.

== Sources ==
- Hamilton, Matthew K. (April 11, 2011). "Diamond, John Roberson (1820–1880)". Handbook of Texas Online. Texas State Historical Association.
