= Diamant (German bicycle company) =

German bicycle brand

Diamant is a German bicycle brand owned by Trek Bicycle Corporation.

== History ==
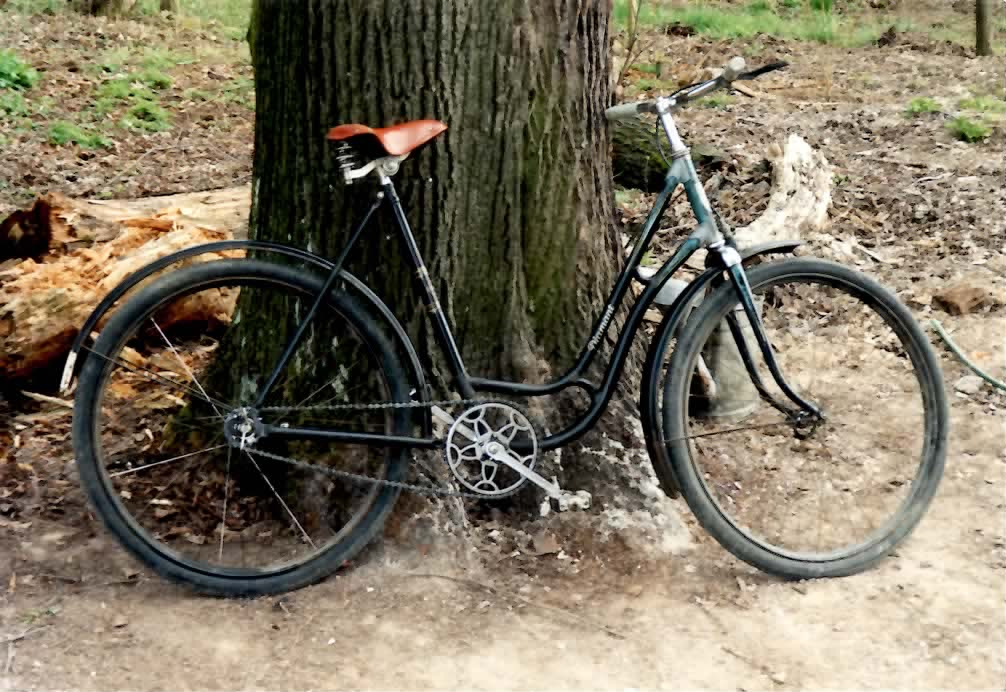
A Diamant from 1960

The first Diamant-branded bicycles came out of Chemnitz, Germany. The company Gebrüder Nevoigt, Reichenbrand / Chemnitz (Gebrüder Nevoigt, Reichenbrand / Chemnitz) was founded in 1882, by Frederick and William Nevoigt. They started out manufacturing parts for sewing-machines and a line of higher-quality needles. In 1885, they added bicycles to their offerings. Following enthusiastic popular demand for their new bicycles, they added a new wing to the factory, and in 1895, the newly branded Diamant bicycles began to roll off the new assembly line.

Innovation continued: in response to existing bicycle chains' poor durability, in 1898 Diamant introduced a new double-roller chain, a design that was to become our modern worldwide standard, now in use on all sorts of machines, from bicycles to motors to industrial machinery. And in 1912, they introduced the "Damenrad" (ladies' bicycle), a new bicycle frame design for ladies, with a top-tube curving down, allowing to step through, instead of over, the bike. The model was dubbed the "Topas". Sales and demand continued to grow, and production capacity needs to be expanded once again. in 1906 the company went public to raise capital for the expansion, becoming "Gebrüder Nevoigt AG, Reichenbrand-Chemnitz".

In 1920, racing sponsorship began, and by 1921, cyclists riding Diamant won 20 out of 29 races. During the depression in 1927, the company went under bankruptcy protection until 1928, when Adam OPEL Ag. acquired a controlling interest, relaunching the company, now Elite-Diamant AG.

In 1934, Diamant introduced the delivery bicycle, with a large adjustable carrier on the front. During the same year, Diamant developed new tube-bending machinery, allowing the introduction of their "Gesundheitslenker" (health-beneficial handlebars), whereby the handles are facing the direction one is going, resulting in a more comfortable ride, on a model dubbed the "Holland-rad" (Hollander bike).

In 1935, growth continued and employment reached 529 employees. But throughout all its history, the company's production rises and falls, following with tumultuous times and social change.

Diamant developed stronger lightweight tubing, allowing the development of their racing bike, model 67, in time for Ernst Ihbe (Leipzig) and Carly Lorenz (Chemnitz) to win gold at the 1936 Olympic Games, and for Diamant to also be in gold position during the German National Championships, and the Worlds Championships in Zürich.

Throughout the second world war, Diamant became obliged to divert production and materials to help in the war effort. Even the well-known Diamant badge fell victim, no longer being made, to save on materials. After the war, during the Russian occupation, the company was taken over by the Soviet state-run company "Awtowelo". In 1951 the company grew to 1,588 employees, and at its head, Kurt Schneeweiß set a new goal of 200,000 bicycles. In 1952, in recognition of its outstanding performance, economical and in job creation, a major part of the company was returned to ownership of the GDR (East Germany), and it became VEB Elite-Diamant (people's-owned corporation Elite-Diamant). In 1953, a record number of 295,000 bicycles were produced, and 1956 saw the 3-millionth Diamant bicycle come off the assembly lines. Production dipped to under 200k units, then rose again to 270k units in 1956, which included 10,000 higher-end sports bikes. These sales, combined with 1,764 flat knitting machines, brought total sales to 47 million German marks. The company went through further growing-pains in the late-sixties, as the projections for 330k units turned out to be far off the mark, from the actual 550,000 units produced in 1969. By the seventies, Diamant was exported to other countries, under the names Elite-Diamant or Original-Diamant. Only in the neighboring West German market could Diamant not be sold under its own name, and was marketed under the name "Diadem" instead.

Following the fall of the Berlin wall, Diamant became a public corporation again, under the name "Elite-Diamant – GmbH Flachstrickmaschinen- und Fahrradwerken Chemnitz". In 1992, the bicycle production division was spun off as a separate corporate entity, "Diamant Fahrradwerke GmbH". 1996 saw the introduction of the "Handy-bicycle", a full-size folding bicycle, made of stainless-steel. The 10-millionth Diamant came out of the factory in 1998.

== Acquisition ==
In 2002, Diamant Fahrradwerke GmbH was acquired by the Trek Bicycle Corporation. The company introduced new models such as the Drive+ electronic drive-assist, and a line of Pedelecs eBikes. Today, the Diamant brand is focused on city, touring and sports riding. This contrasts with Trek's focus on racing, such that the two brands together span a wider range of users. In some case virtually identical models are sold under the Trek name in some countries while they are sold under the Diamant brand in Germany.

The company is not connected with the Norwegian bicycle manufacturer of the same name nor with the Belgian brand Diamant.
