= Upper Love, U.S. Virgin Islands =

Coordinates: 17°43′52″N 64°48′56″W

Upper Love, United States Virgin Islands
- Village
- Interactive map of Upper Love, United States Virgin Islands
- Country: United States Virgin Islands
- Island: Saint Croix
- Time zone: UTC-4 (AST)

Upper Love is a settlement on the island of Saint Croix in the United States Virgin Islands.

== History ==
In 1816, IJpper Love (Princes Quarter No. 18 &. 19, Centre Poliee Distnct, Frederiksteds Jurisdiction) covered 399 acres of land of which 179 acres were planted with sugar cane and 121 acres were under other cultivation. 99 enslaved labourers were present on the estate.

On 10 February 1835, Upper Love was sold at auction to the Royal Loan Commission for Ps. 35,050. Pm 6 April 1850, it was sold at auction to G. J. Mudie for $45,000.
