= Diamante poem =

Seven-lined poetry form

A diamante poem, or diamond poem, is a style of poetry that is made up of seven lines. The text forms the shape of a diamond (◊). The form was developed by Iris Tiedt in A New Poetry Form: The Diamante (1969).

== Description ==
A diamante poem is a poem that makes the shape of a diamond. The poem can be used in two ways, either comparing and contrasting two different subjects, or naming synonyms at the beginning of the poem and then antonyms for the second half for a subject.

In the poems, the subject is named in one word in the first line. The second line consists of two adjectives describing the subject, and the third line contains three verbs ending in the suffix ing which are related to the subject. A fourth line then has four nouns relating to the subject. The fifth returns to three verbs, the sixth two adjectives, and the final line a synonym of the subject.

If written to contrast two subjects, the fourth line consists of two nouns about the first subject, followed by two nouns about the second. The fifth, sixth and seventh lines then refer to the second subject. The fourth line may also be two short phrases about the two subjects.

== Example ==
An example of a diamante poem contrasting two subjects – trees and rivers:

tree
tall, green
growing, reaching, shading
leaves, branches, water, pebbles
flowing, splashing, curving
deep, blue
river
