= Diamant (Norwegian bicycle company) =

Norwegian bicycle brand

Diamant is a Norwegian bicycle brand established in 1901 by A. Gresvig. Diamant was originally manufactured in Oslo, but in 1955 production was taken over by the Swedish company Crescent. Production remained in Sweden until 1970 when the Danish bicycle manufacturer Kildemose took over production. In 1990, most of production was moved to Asia.

Almost every fourth bike sold in Norway is a Diamant.

The company is not connected with the German bicycle manufacturer of the same name nor with the Belgian brand Diamant.
