= Diamond Island (Tasmania) =

Island in Tasmania, Australia

Coordinates: 41°51′S 148°17′E

Diamond Island also known locally as Cod Rock, is a low granite island with an area of 6.76 ha. Diamond Island lies roughly 200m off the central east coast of Tasmania and has a maximum elevation of 9m.

It is located just off the town of Bicheno. Depending on the tide it is connected to the mainland by a sand spit during which time it is accessible by foot. It is a nature reserve.

== Fauna ==
The island is a little penguin rookery numbering 200 breeding pairs. Species of seabird and wader have also been recorded breeding on Diamond island including the sooty oystercatcher.
