= Ann Diamond (midwife) =

New Zealand hotel-keeper, storekeeper, midwife

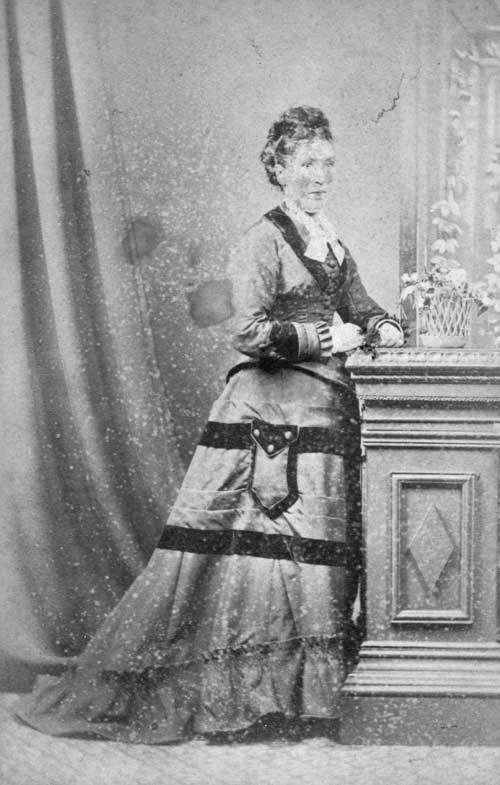
- Born: Ann Gleeson; 1827–1831; Adare, County Limerick, Ireland
- Died: 22 April 1881; Red Jacks, New Zealand
- Occupations: Hotelkeeper; storekeeper; midwife

Ann Diamond (née Gleeson; c. 1831 – 22 April 1881) was a New Zealand hotelkeeper, storekeeper and midwife.

== Biography ==
Ann Gleeson was born in Adare, County Limerick, Ireland in about 1831. She emigrated to Melbourne, Australia in 1858.

She married Patrick Diamond on 7 December 1859, and they had two daughters, Rosanna and Mary Jane.

They migrated to Dunedin, New Zealand in 1862, where she ran a boarding house with her cousin, Johanna Shanahan, and friend, Mary Maloney. She learned her midwifery skills from a doctor who boarded at the house.

In 1865, Diamond, Shanahan and Maloney left for Greymouth and set up a general store and hotel in Red Jacks on the West Coast. The hotel was generally known as Diamond's Hotel.

She died at Red Jacks from a strangulated hernia on 22 April 1881.
