= Diamond Lake (Ontario) =

Diamond Lake is the name of at least nine different lakes in Ontario, Canada:

- Diamond Lake, Kenora District 49°49′5″N 92°29′21″W
- Diamond Lake, Cochrane District 49°48′10″N 84°25′15″W
- Diamond Lake, Algoma District 46°25′18″N 83°54′54″W
- Diamond Lake, Sudbury District 46°38′52″N 81°39′46″W
- Diamond Lake, Hastings County 45°4′26″N 78°2′12″W
- Diamond Lake, Nipissing District/Sudbury District 47°12′6″N 80°14′2″W
- Diamond Lake, Timiskaming District 48°6′40″N 79°44′59″W
- Diamond Lake, Renfrew County 45°22′7″N 77°32′12″W
- Diamond Lake, Parry Sound District 45°23′36″N 79°46′19″W

== See also ==
- List of lakes in Ontario
