= Warren (1829 ship) =

History

United States
- Name: Warren
- Namesake: Warren, Rhode Island
- Builder: Swansea, Massachusetts
- Launched: 1829
- Fate: Burned 10 July 1852

General characteristics
- Tons burthen: 383 (bm)
- Sail plan: Brig

Warren was launched at Swansea, Massachusetts, in 1829. She made six complete voyages as a whaler operating from Warren, Rhode Island, before she burned in the Anadir Sea on 10 July 1852, on her seventh whaling voyage.

== Career ==
1st whaling voyage (1830–1834): Captain William Mayhew Jr., sailed from Warren on or about 8 November 1830, bound for the Pacific. On 21 June 1832, Warren rescued the crew of the British brig Science off Cape Horn, Chile. Science had been sailing from Van Diemen's Land to England when heavy seas at 56°S 125°W had so damaged her that her crew had been forced to abandon her. Warren returned to Warren on 7 May 1834, with 2300 barrels of whale oil.

2nd whaling voyage (1834–1837): Captain Mayhew sailed on 28 September 1834, bound for the Pacific. He returned to Warren in 1837, with some 1000 barrels of sperm oil and 2000 barrels of whale oil.

3rd whaling voyage (1834–1837): Captain Lewis sailed Warren from Warren on 9 July 1837, bound for New Zealand. Warren, under Captain Russell, returned to the US, via Bahia, Brazil, arriving at New Port on 16 January 1840, with 26,000 lb of whale bone, 235 barrels of sperm oil, and 3065 barrels of whale oil.

4th whaling voyage (1840–1843): Captain Henry Cleveland sailed from Warren on 26 August 1840, bound for the Pacific. Warren returned home 6 April 1843, with some 600 barrels of sperm oil, 3400 barrels of whale oil, and 33,000 pounds of whale bone.

5th whaling voyage (1843–1846): Captain Benjamin A. Gardner sailed on 4 August 1843, bound for the Pacific. Warren returned home on 9 June 1846, with 30 barrels of sperm oil, 2100 barrels of whale oil, and 3000 pounds of whalebone.

6th whaling voyage (1847–1851): Captain Charles T. Evans sailed on 29 November 1847, bound for the NW coast. Warren returned on 8 May 1851, with 168 barrels of sperm oil, 2789 barrels of whale oil, and 29,100 pounds of whalebone.

== Fate ==
Captain Nathan B. Heath sailed from Warren on 19 November 1851, bound for the North Pacific.

Warren was in the Gulf of Anadyr when she caught fire, burned to the water line, and exploded. This occurred either on 4 July 1852, or 10 July. Captain Heath and his crew ended up on the whaler California. (Note: California had been launched at New Bedford in 1842. Between 1842, and when she was broken up at San Francisco in 1906, she made over 20 whaling voyages.)
