= Dimond =

Dimond may refer to:

== People ==
- Anthony Dimond (1881–1953), American politician, U.S. House delegate from Alaska (1933–1945)
- Bobby Dimond (1929–2020), Australian rugby league footballer
- Diane Dimond (born 1952), American investigative journalist and TV commentator
- John H. Dimond (1918–1985), American jurist, member of inaugural Alaska Supreme Court
- Michael Dimond, Superior of Most Holy Family Monastery
- Peter Dimond (1938–2021), Australian rugby league footballer
- William Dimond (1781–c.1837), English playwright
- William Wyatt Dimond (1750–1813), English actor and theatre manager
- David Robert Dimond Chief Warrant Officer two, U.S. Army 740A

== Other uses ==
- Dimond High School, Anchorage, Alaska, United States
- Dimond Center, a shopping mall in Anchorage, Alaska, United States
- Dimond District, Oakland, California
- Dimond Gorge, a gorge in Western Australia

== See also ==
- Diamond (disambiguation)
- Dymond (disambiguation)
