= Alex Diamond =

German visual artist, pseudonym of Jörg Heikhaus

Alex Diamond is the name of an art project that was initiated in 2004 by the Hamburg artist Jörg Heikhaus (born 29 November 1967 in Cologne). Jörg Heikhaus is also the founder of the gallery 'heliumcowboy' (since 2002) in Hamburg, whose operation was temporarily suspended in 2013 to devote himself better to his own work as an artist. Until 2012, the project was promoted without a direct link to the artist himself, which made it unknown who was behind the pseudonym. The purpose of this secrecy was to perform various self-presentations and explore the extent to which an artist without an explicit identity can establish itself. At the beginning of 2010, the artist dropped his anonymity and uses Alex Diamond as a pseudonym. Following the end of the project with an exhibition at Kunstverein Buchholz in 2012, Heikhaus continued to use the Alex Diamond artist name.

== Work ==
Alex Diamond's work focuses mainly on working with wood. Characteristic of his works are dynamic figures and a strict and reduced coloring. Both are often found in the woodcuts, wall sculptures, installations, as well as the furniture and wood prints of the artist. Typical for his stage sets are layered, meticulously crafted and detailed sculptural woodcuts mixed with various painting and dyeing techniques. At the center of his artistic activity is the woodcut, which he does not understand as a mere printing instrument, but already as a work in itself. The artist sees himself mainly as a 'story teller'. The main part of his work is devoted to the analysis and interpretation of contemporary culture and its recurrent patterns of recognition, with an artistic focus on the study of the social and cultural aspects of human coexistence.

== Solo exhibitions ==
Solo exhibitions in chronological order:

- Alex Diamond's Strange Sofa. heliumcowboy artspace, Hamburg, 2004.
- Gold, Kinder!. heliumcowboy artspace, Hamburg, 2005.
- Love Me With A Gun To My Head. heliumcowboy artspace, Hamburg, 2007.
- SCOPE Art Fair New York. Solo exhibition at fair with heliumcowboy artspace, New York, 2008.
- Don't worry 'bout a thing 1, Being Alex Diamond. heliumcowboy artspace, Hamburg, 2009.
- Don't worry 'bout a thing 2, Demon Circus. Iguapop Gallery, Barcelona, 2010.
- Damage:Control. Factory Fresh, New York, 2010.
- Into the Night / 01. Nice/Nice Gallery, Hannover, 2011.
- The Alex Diamond Mining Company. Vicious Gallery, Hamburg, 2011.
- You Can Have Your Cake, But You Can't Touch The Icing. Kunstverein Buchholz, Buchholz, 2012.
- Psychonoisedesire, Gallery heliumcowboy artspace. Hamburg, 2012.
- Desirecologne. Gallery Die Kunstagentin, Cologne, 2013.
- The Daily Mood Of ..... Gallery Herr Beinlich Contemporary Art, Bielefeld 2013.
- Weapons Of Mass Seduction I (with Victor Castillo). Gallery heliumcowboy artspace, Hamburg, 2014.
- Weapons Of Mass Seduction II (with Victor Castillo). Gallery heliumcowboy artspace, Hamburg, 2017.
- Kind, gentle and fully dressed. Gallery heliumcowboy artspace, Hamburg, 2018.

== Group exhibitions ==
Selection of group exhibitions in chronological order:

- SCOPE Art Fair Miami. heliumcowboy artspace, Miami, 2006.
- SCOPE Art Fair New York. heliumcowboy artspace, New York, 2007.
- Don't Wake Daddy. Feinkunst Krüger, Hamburg, 2007.
- SCOPE Art Fair Basel. heliumcowboy artspace, Basel, 2007.
- SCOPE Art Fair Miami. heliumcowboy artspace, Miami, 2007.
- No New Enemies. Le Musee du Botanique, Brüssel, 2008.
- SCOPE Art Fair Miami. heliumcowboy artspace, Miami, 2008.
- Das Herz von St. Pauli. Iguapop Gallery, Barcelona, 2009.
- Threesome. Nice/Nice Exhibition Space, Hannover, 2009.
- VOLTA5 Art Fair Basel. heliumcowboy artspace, Basel, 2009.
- Street Art New York. Silent auction benefit for Free Arts NYC, Factory Fresh Gallery, New York, 2010.
- Mountain to Surf. heliumcowboy artspace, Hamburg, 2010.
- Preview Berlin Art Fair. heliumcowboy artspace, Berlin, 2010.
- The Helping Hounds Of Hell. Art on skateboards, Berlin and Hamburg, 2011.
- George hearts Maria. heliumcowboy artspace, Hamburg, 2012.
- Wipeout. Viva con Agua Millerntor Gallery 2012, Millerntorstadion, Hamburg, 2012.
- Das Eigene Ich. Affenfaust Gallery, Hamburg, 2014.
- Don't Wake Daddy IX. Gallery Feinkunst Krüger, Hamburg, 2014.
- SCOPE Art Fair. heliumcowboy artspace, Basel, 2015.
- Art Copenhagen. heliumcowboy artspace, Copenhagen, 2015.
- Don't Wake Daddy X. Gallery Feinkunst Krüger, Hamburg, 2015.
- PULS 16. Gallery Wolfsen, Aalborg, Denmark, 2016.
- SCOPE Art Fair. Gallery Wolfsen, Basel, 2016.
- URBAN DAWN. Curator19.90, Beirut, 2016.
- Mist Of Madness. heliumcowboy artspace, Hamburg, 2016.
- Don't Wake Daddy XI. Gallery Feinkunst Krüger, Hamburg, 2016.
- Welcome to New Jersey. Jonathan LeVine Gallery, New Jersey, 2017.
- Trumpomania. Curator19.90 & Melissa McCraig Welles, New York, 2017.
- COWBOYLAND. 15-year anniversary show heliumcowboy artspace, Hamburg, 2017.

== Publications ==
Selected publications in chronological order:

- Love Me With A Gun To My Head. Exhibition catalog, heliumcowboy artspace, Hamburg, 2007.
- Do not Worry 'bout A Thing! (Being Alex Diamond). Gudberg, Hamburg, 2009.
- Das Kartell. Krüger, Ralf; Tornow, Christoph; Heikhaus, Jörg (eds.). Gudberg, 2011. ISBN 978-3-943061-00-0.
- The Alex Diamond Mining Company. Gudberg, Hamburg, 2012.
- Design of the 2017 trophy for HANS – Der Hamburger Musikpreis (with 4000)
