= Louisiana's 51st House of Representatives district =

American legislative district

Louisiana's 51st State House of Representatives district
Representative
Beryl Amedée; R–Gray

Louisiana's 51st House of Representatives district is one of 105 Louisiana House of Representatives districts. It is currently represented by Republican Beryl Amedée of Gray.

== Geography ==
HD51 includes a small part Morgan City, as well as the census-designated places of Amelia and Gray.

== Election results ==
Year	Winning candidate	Party	Percent	Opponent	Party	Percent
2011	Joe Harrison	Republican	71.8%	Howard John Castay Jr.	Independent	28.2%
2015	Beryl Amedée	Republican	52%	Joe Harrison	Republican	48%
2019	Beryl Amedée	Republican	64.4%	Clayton Voisin	Republican	35.6%
2023	Beryl Amedée	Republican	Cancelled			
