= Diamond Joe =

The nickname "Diamond Joe" or "Diamond Jo" may refer to:

== People ==
- Joe Esposito (politician) (1872–1928), American politician during the Prohibition era, known as Diamond Joe
- Joseph "Diamond Jo" Reynolds (1819–1891), American entrepreneur and founder of the Diamond Jo Line of steamboats
- Giuseppe Viserte (1890–1921), American mafia figure in New York City, known as Diamond Joe

== Places ==
Each located in the U.S. state of Iowa

- Diamond Jo Boat Store and Office, a historic building located in Dubuque
- Diamond Jo Dubuque, a casino and entertainment complex in Dubuque
- Diamond Jo Worth, a casino and entertainment complex in Worth County

== Fictional characters ==
- Joe Biden (The Onion), a fictionalized caricature of American politician Joe Biden with the nickname "Diamond Joe" (among others)
- "Diamond Joe" Quimby, a character in The Simpsons who is the corrupt mayor of Springfield

== Folk songs ==
- Diamond Joe (African American folk song), an African American folk song first recorded in 1909 and performed by Harry Belafonte, Jerry Garcia, and Bob Dylan
- Diamond Joe (cowboy song), a cowboy song written in 1944 by Baldwin "Butch" Hawes and based on an earlier folk song of the same name recorded by John Lomax

== See also ==
- Diamond Jim (disambiguation)
- Diamond (given name)
