= Diamond Jo Casino =

Diamond Jo Casino may refer to one of the following:

- Diamond Jo Dubuque, a casino and entertainment complex in Dubuque, Iowa, U.S.
- Diamond Jo Worth, a casino and entertainment complex in Worth County, Iowa, U.S.

== See also ==
- Boyd Gaming, parent company of the above
- Diamond Jo (disambiguation)
