= Butch Gautreaux =

American politician (1947–2020)

Member of the Louisiana Senate from the 21st district
- In office 2000–2012
- Preceded by: John J. Siracusa
- Succeeded by: R. L. "Bret" Allain, II

Member of the Louisiana House of Representatives from the 51st district
- In office 1996–2000
- Preceded by: John J. Siracusa
- Succeeded by: Carla Blanchard Dartez

Personal details
- Born: Dudley Anthony Gautreaux; December 12, 1947 Morgan City, Louisiana, U.S.
- Died: February 22, 2020 (aged 72) Morgan City, Louisiana, U.S.
- Party: Democratic
- Spouse: Marilyn Mire Gautreaux
- Education: Nicholls State University
- Occupation: Businessman

Military service
- Branch/service: United States Navy

Dudley Anthony Gautreaux, known as Butch Gautreaux (December 12, 1947 – February 22, 2020) was an American politician who served as a Democratic member of the Louisiana State Senate from Morgan City, Louisiana. From 2000 to 2012, he represented Senate District 21. In 2012, the reconfigured district incorporated mostly Republican portions of Iberia, Lafourche, St. Mary, and Lafourche parishes.

Gautreaux won his last election to the Senate in 2007, when he defeated the Republican Clayton D. Diaz, 25,348 (71 percent) to 10,372 (29 percent). At that time the district also included two precincts in St. Martin Parish, since removed from the reconfiguration.

From 1996 to 2000, Gautreaux was a member of the Louisiana House of Representatives from District 51 but vacated the post after the single term to run for the Senate. In the 1995 general election, Gautreaux defeated the Democrat-turned-Republican Joe Harrison, 8,457 votes (69 percent) to 3,809 ballots (31 percent). Harrison was subsequently elected in 2007 to House District 51 and still holds the seat.

== Background ==
Gautreaux attended Nicholls State University in Thibodaux, Louisiana. He served from 1967 to 1972 in the United States Navy. He is active in Rotary International, having been secretary of the Morgan City chapter. Gautreaux has served as vice president of marketing for Marsianin Industrial Contractors LLC in Morgan City and administrator for Arabie Trucking Services LLC in Thibodaux.

== Race for lieutenant governor ==
Gautreaux sought the lieutenant governorship of Louisiana in a 2010 special election occasioned by the resignation of incumbent Mitch Landrieu when Landrieu became mayor of New Orleans. In a field of eight candidates Gautreaux, who had the official endorsement of the Louisiana AFL-CIO, polled 4 percent of the vote. He then endorsed fellow Democrat Caroline Fayard in the runoff against the frontrunner, the Republican Jay Dardenne, a former State Senate colleague of Gautreaux's. Dardenne won a full term as lieutenant governor in the nonpartisan blanket primary held on October 22, 2011.

Gautreaux was term-limited in the state Senate and ineligible to run in the October 22 primary. His successor is Republican R. L. "Bret" Allain, II, who received 14,618 votes (51.4 percent) in the contest with another Republican, Darrin Guidry, who polled 13,846 votes (48.6 percent). No Democrat sought Gautreaux's seat in the revised district.

== Personal life ==
Gautreaux and his wife, the former Marilyn Mire, were Roman Catholic. He died on February 22, 2020, in Morgan City, Louisiana at age 72.

Louisiana State Senate
Preceded by John J. Siracusa	Louisiana State Senator from District 21 (effective 2012: Iberia, Lafourche, St. Mary, and Terrebonne parishes); Dudley Anthony "Butch" Gautreaux; 2000-2012	Succeeded by Robert Lebreton "Bret" Allain, II
Louisiana House of Representatives
Preceded by John J. Siracusa	Louisiana State Representative from District 51 (Assumption, St. Mary, and Terrebonne parishes); Dudley Anthony "Butch" Gautreaux; 1996–2000	Succeeded by Carla Blanchard Dartez
