= Amelia Belle Casino =

Riverboat casino in Amelia, Louisiana

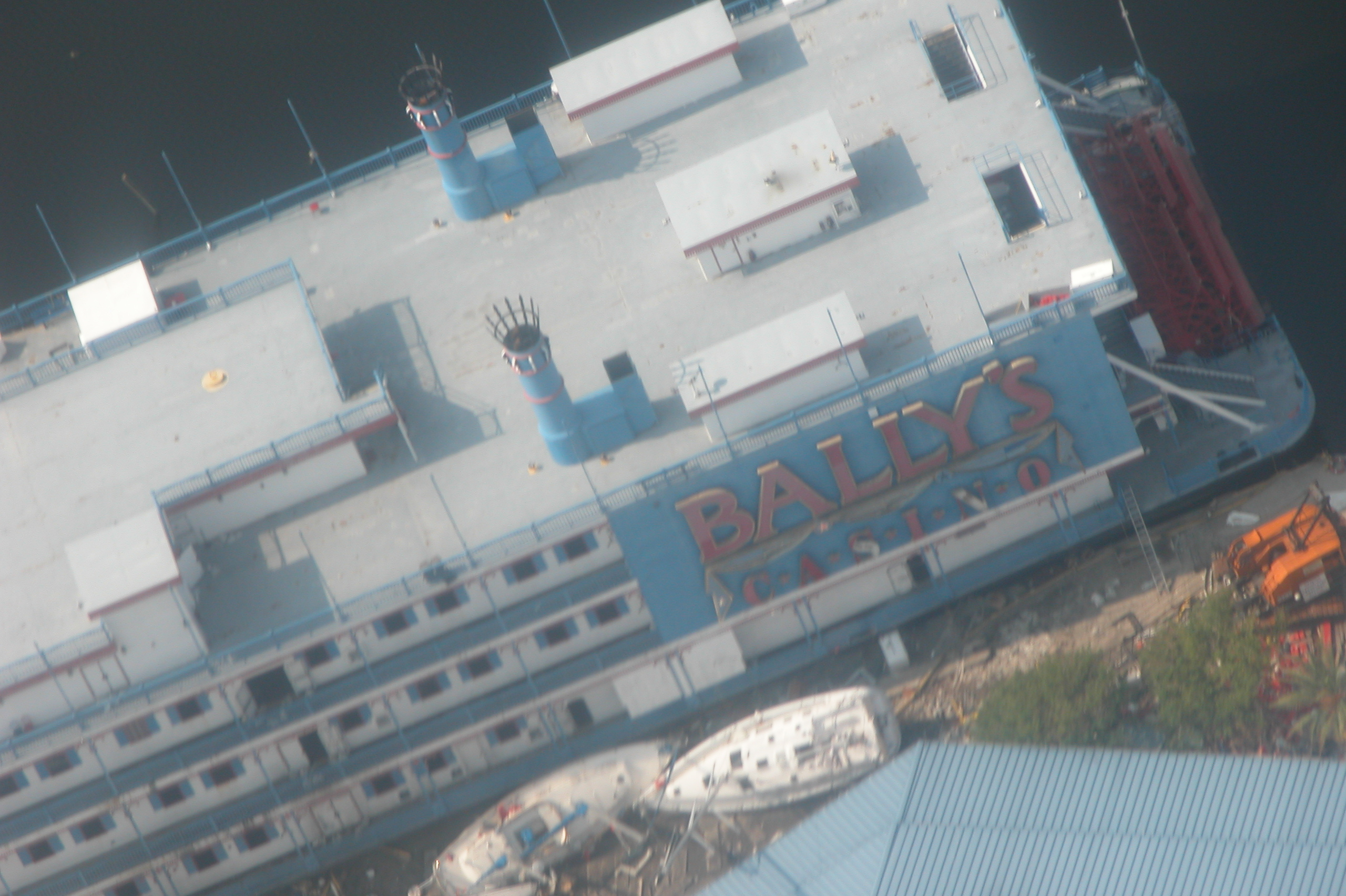
- Bally's Casino New Orleans after Hurricane Katrina.
- Interactive map of Amelia Belle Casino
- Location: Amelia, Louisiana; 500 Lake Palourde Rd; 29°39′41″N 91°05′59″W
- Opened: 1995
- Gaming space: 30,000 sq ft (2,800 m^{2})
- Notable restaurants: The Cajun Buffet; Bayou Cafe
- Casino type: Riverboat
- Owner: Boyd Gaming
- Previous names: Bally's New Orleans; Belle of Orleans
- Website: AmeliaBelleCasino.com

Amelia Belle Casino is a riverboat casino located in Amelia, Louisiana. It is owned by Boyd Gaming.

== History ==
The riverboat casino opened in July, 1995 as Bally's New Orleans Casino and owned by Bally Entertainment. The name was later changed to Bally’s Belle of New Orleans.

In 2004, the casino managed to have the property re-assessed by the Louisiana Tax Commission for $6.5 million, citing the market prices of former casino boats, even though Bally's was still in operation at the time. Previously in 2002, Erroll Williams, the 3rd district assessor, assessed the riverboat at $21.6 million, noting a $33 million construction cost and a 12-year depreciation schedule. It had also previously been granted an exemption on a 3% tax increase imposed on other riverboat casinos in 2001. Also in 2004, a federal probe began into Bally's reduction of its tax liability by 70%, which saved the casino $1 million over 3 years. In late 2004, Columbia Sussex, looking to become a key player in casino operations, first expressed interest in purchasing the Bally's New Orleans property. The sale of Bally's New Orleans to Columbia Sussex was announced in late 2004 and was projected to close in 2005. Simultaneously, Caesars Entertainment was in the process of being acquired by Harrah's. One of the reasons for the sale of the casino was avoiding competition with Harrah's New Orleans once Harrah's had acquired Caesars Entertainment, and, at the time, the Bally's property was its smallest casino. In 2006, the Orleans Levee Board was allowed to seize the boat by a federal judge after Columbia Sussex failed to pay $1.3 million in lease payments. The court order gave Columbia Sussex 10 days to settle the delinquent debt. Later in 2006, voters had the chance to decide whether or not to allow the boat's relocation to St. Mary Parish. The boat had been moved from its Lake Pontchartrain location to Mobile, Alabama for repairs after it broke loose from its moorings and slammed into a pier during Hurricane Katrina.

In 2007, after the ship was repaired in Mobile, Alabama following extensive storm damage from Hurricane Katrina, the riverboat was towed to Bayou Boeuf to its new home in Amelia, Louisiana. Since Bayou Boeuf is part of the Gulf Intracoastal Waterway, it is deemed one of nine channels in Louisiana where riverboat casinos are permitted. It became the second casino in St. Mary Parish, joining the Cypress Bayou Casino in Charenton, which became the first Native casino in the state when it opened in 1993. It opened for business on May 17, 2007.

In 2009, Peninsula Gaming, which also owned Evangeline Downs, bought the Amelia Belle for $106.5 million from Columbia Sussex. Prior to that, there were plans to swap the riverboats of Belle of Baton Rouge and Amelia Belle, but those plans were scrapped when Tropicana Entertainment, owner of the Belle of Baton Rouge, filed for bankruptcy. In 2012, Boyd Gaming acquired Peninsula Gaming for $200 million, plus $1.2 billion in debt.

In 2015, the site of the former Bally's on Lake Pontchartrain near the Lakefront Airport at the South Shore Marina was planned to be re-developed into an outdoor water park and music venue.

== Property information ==
The casino consists of over 800 slot machines and 11 table games in its 30,000 square feet of gaming space. Amelia Belle uses Boyd's "B Connected" players card, linked to many other properties. There are two restaurants, The Cajun Buffet and the Bayou Cafe. The casino is open Monday through Thursday 9 am-4 am, and then 24 hours a day on the weekend.

== See also ==
- List of casinos in Louisiana
