= Diamond (given name) =

Name list

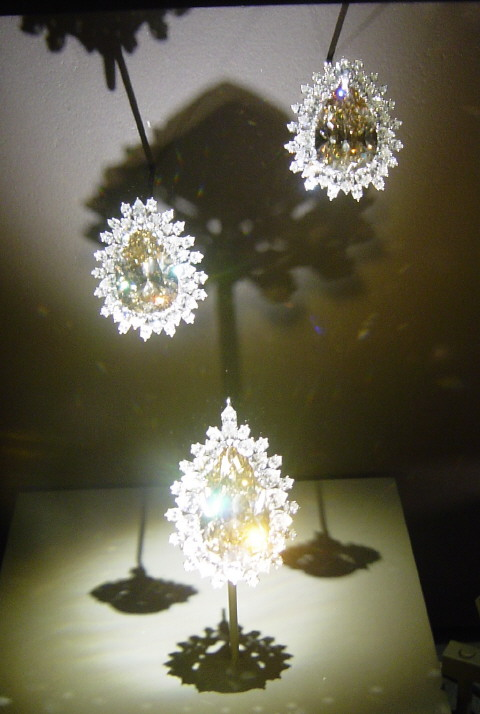
- The name Diamond is taken from the gemstone.
- Gender: Unisex

Origin
- Origin: Greek
- Meaning: "diamond"

Other names
- Related names: Deimantė, Diamanda, Diamanto, Dymond

Diamond is a given name derived from the name of the diamond gemstone. The word is derived from the Greek adamas. The name was among the 1,000 most popular names for newborn girls in the United States between 1986 and 2014 and remains in regular use. Deimantė, a Lithuanian variant, was the 10th most popular name for baby girls born in Lithuania in 2007.

Usage of the name was occasionally inspired by the Diamond Jubilee of Queen Victoria in 1897. Other jewel names such as Ruby, Pearl, and Opal also first came into wider use in the Anglosphere during the Victorian Era along with other names from the natural world. The boy hero of the 1871 children's book At the Back of the North Wind by George MacDonald is named Diamond.

== Women ==
=== Given name ===
- Diamond DeShields (born 1995), American basketball player
- Diamond Donner (born c. 1879 – death date unknown), American stage actress
- Diamond Johnson (born 2002), American basketball player
- Diamond Miller (born 2001), American basketball player
- Dymond Simon (born 1989), American basketball player
- Diamond White (born 1999), American singer-songwriter and actress
- Shyyell Diamond Sanchez-McCray (died 2026), American transgender drag performer and activist

=== Stage name ===
- Zhang Bichen (born 1989), or called Diamond Zhang, Chinese singer-songwriter
- Diamond and Silk, stage name of American conservative political commentators and vloggers Lynnette Hardaway (1971–2023) and Rochelle Hardaway Richardson (born 1970)
- Skin Diamond, stage name of American actress, model, singer-songwriter and pornographic actress Raylin Joy (born 1987)

== Men ==
=== Given name ===
- Diamond Jenness (1886–1969), New Zealand born Canadian anthropologist
- Diamond Stone (born 1997), American basketball player

=== Stage name ===
- Diamond Platnumz, stage name of Tanzanian singer, dancer, philanthropist and businessman Naseeb Issack (born 1998)
- King Diamond, stage name of Danish rock musician Kim Petersen (born 1956)

=== Middle name ===
- Lou Diamond Phillips (born 1962), American actor, director, and writer

=== Nickname ===
- Diamond Jim (disambiguation), several people
- Diamond Joe (disambiguation), several people

== Related names ==
- Diamanda (English)
- Deimantė (Lithuanian)
- Diamante (Italian), (Latin)

== See also ==
- Damond, given name and surname
- Diamond (surname), the surname
