= Peninsula Pacific Entertainment =

American casino gaming company

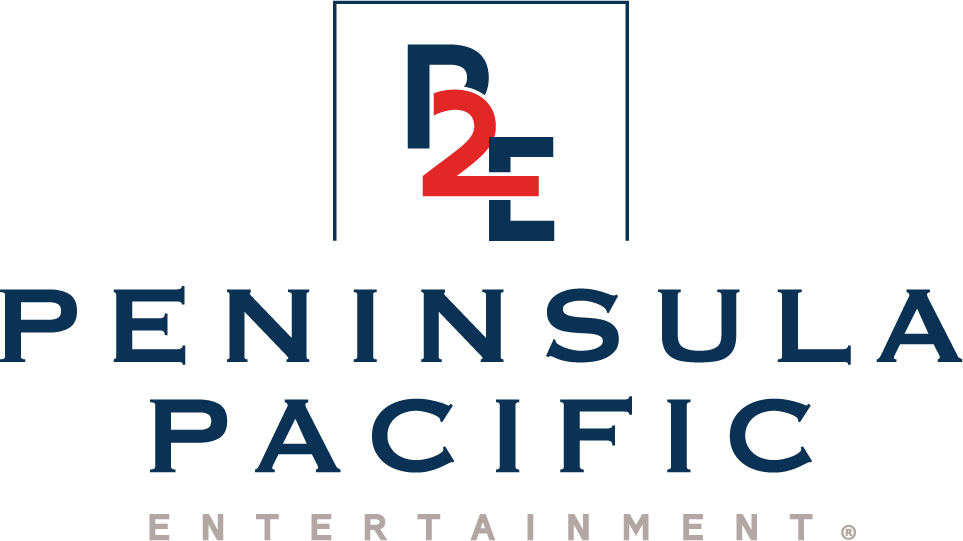
- Type: Private
- Industry: Gaming
- Headquarters: Los Angeles
- Key people: Brent Stevens (Chairman & co-founder); Jonathan Swain (President)
- Website: p2e.com

Peninsula Pacific Entertainment (P2E) is a casino gaming company based in Los Angeles. It began operations in 1999, doing business through a subsidiary, Peninsula Gaming. Its holdings grew to five properties, until 2012, when Peninsula Gaming was sold to Boyd Gaming for $1.45 billion. Afterward, P2E continued to acquire and develop gaming properties. In 2022, it sold the bulk of its assets to Churchill Downs, Inc. for $2.8 billion.

== History ==
=== Peninsula Gaming (1999–2012) ===
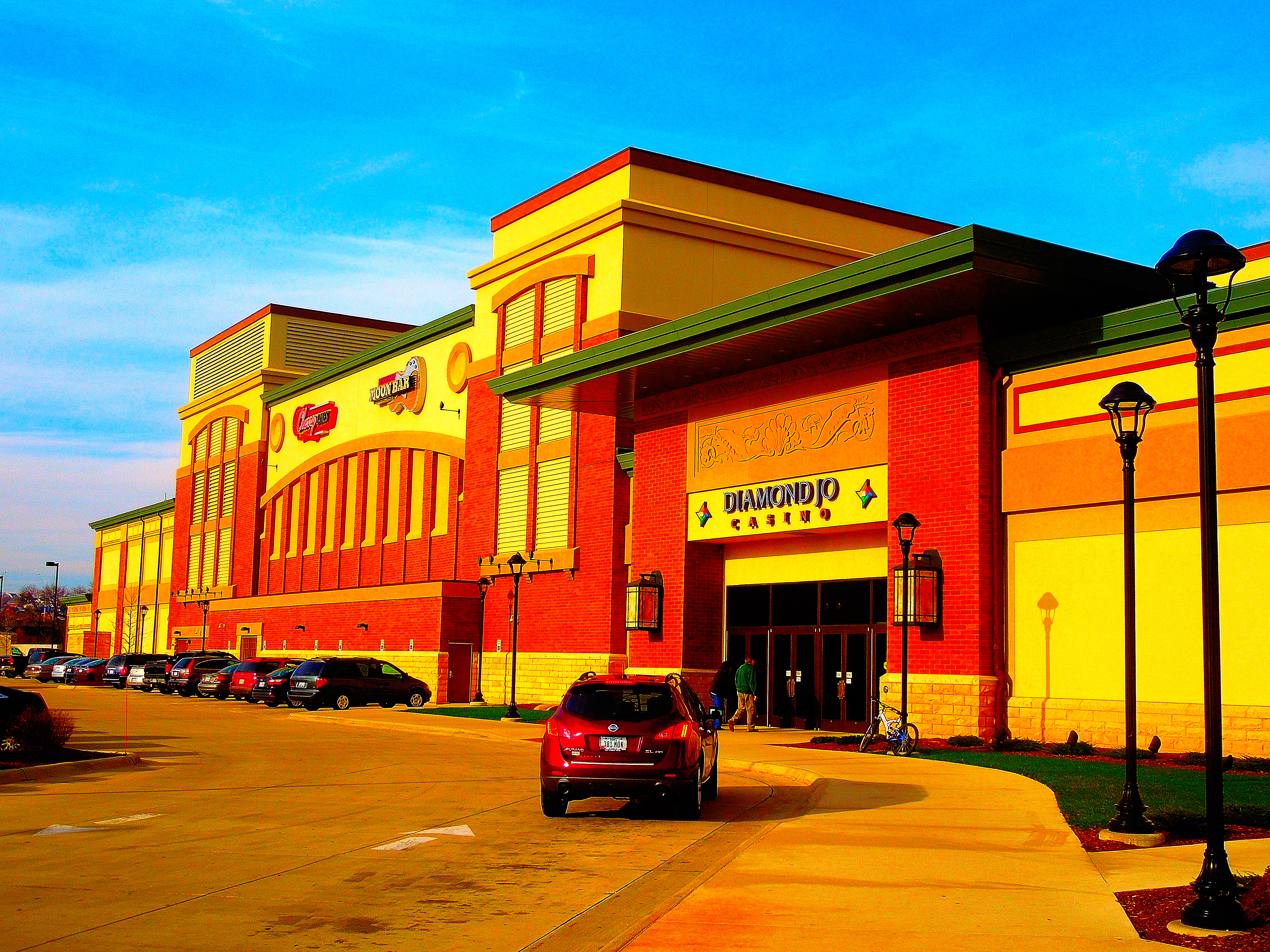
Diamond Jo Casino in Dubuque, Iowa

In January 1999, Los Angeles-based AB Capital agreed to purchase the Diamond Jo Casino in Dubuque, Iowa, for $77 million. The company's major shareholders were Los Angeles investment banker Brent Stevens and Las Vegas gaming developer Michael Luzich. The purchase was completed in July 1999, by which time the company had changed its name to Peninsula Gaming.

In February 2002, Peninsula bought a fifty percent interest in the Evangeline Downs racetrack in Lafayette Parish, Louisiana from B. I. Moody for $15 million. They bought the remaining half several months later from William Trotter for another $15 million, plus 0.5% of slot revenues for the first ten years. After Lafayette voters had rejected slot machines at the track, Evangeline Downs had planned a move to St. Landry Parish, which Peninsula carried out. The casino at the new site opened in late 2003, with races following in 2005.

In 2004, Peninsula announced a proposed sister casino to the Diamond Jo, to be built in Worth County, Iowa at a cost of $40 million. The project was awarded a gaming license in May 2005, and the Diamond Jo Worth opened in April 2006.

In 2009, Peninsula proposed building a $150-million racetrack casino in Des Moines, Iowa that would be a sister property to the Prairie Meadows racino. Prairie Meadows ultimately rejected the plan.

In June 2009, Peninsula agreed to buy the Amelia Belle riverboat casino in Amelia, Louisiana from Columbia Sussex for $106.5 million. The purchase closed in October 2009.

In November 2009, the company partnered with a group of local investors in a proposal to build a casino in Fort Dodge, Iowa. The application for Diamond Jo Fort Dodge was ultimately rejected by the Iowa Racing and Gaming Commission, over concerns that the casino would draw too much business from the Wild Rose Casino in Emmetsburg. Criminal charges were later filed against Peninsula and two of its executives (Brent Stevens and Jonathan Swain), alleging that they improperly funneled $25,000 in campaign contributions to Governor Chet Culver through three of the Fort Dodge investors. The case was ultimately settled, with the criminal charges being dismissed and Peninsula agreeing to pay the costs of the investigation plus a $4,000 civil penalty. In the settlement agreement, the company and its executives denied that they intended to violate the law.

In 2010, Peninsula held discussions with the city of Davenport, Iowa about redeveloping or replacing the Rhythm City Casino, but the company withdrew to focus on its proposed Kansas casino.

In July 2010, Peninsula submitted a bid for the sole available casino license in south central Kansas, proposing to build the Kansas Star Casino in Mulvane. The proposal was selected as the winner, and Peninsula opened the casino in a temporary facility in December 2011, moving to a permanent facility in December 2012.

In May 2012, Boyd Gaming agreed to buy Peninsula Gaming for $1.45 billion. Boyd executives particularly emphasized their interest in the high growth potential of the Kansas Star Casino. The acquisition was completed on November 20, 2012.

=== Peninsula Pacific Entertainment (2013–present) ===
Following the sale to Boyd, the holding company that had owned Peninsula Gaming continued to do business as Peninsula Pacific Entertainment.

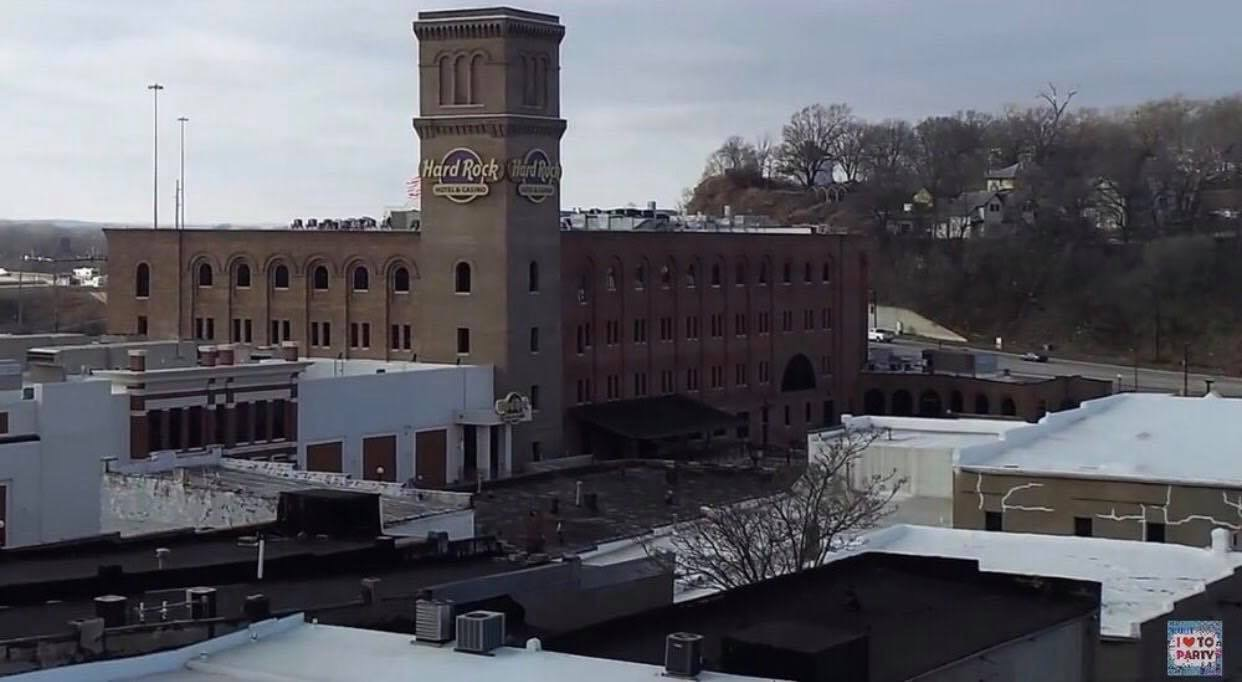
Hard Rock Hotel & Casino in Sioux City, Iowa

In January 2013, P2E partnered with Warner Gaming in developing the Hard Rock Hotel & Casino Sioux City, becoming 50% owners of the property when it opened the next year. P2E bought out Warner's stake in the property in 2020.

The company joined with local investors in July 2013 to propose a casino in Cedar Rapids, Iowa. The plan for the Cedar Crossing Casino was rejected by state gaming regulators in 2014 and again in 2017. P2E said in 2022 that it would submit a new proposal to regulators in 2024, after expiration of a two-year state moratorium on new casinos. On February 6, 2025, the Iowa Racing and Gaming Commission voted in favor of granting P2E the license for the Cedar Crossing casino. The company and city officials broke ground on the project the following day, with an anticipated opening of December 31, 2026.

In 2014, the company joined with Wilmorite in a proposal for a casino resort in Tyre, New York. The Del Lago Resort and Casino opened in 2017. P2E agreed in 2019 to buy out Wilmorite's stake, becoming the sole owner of the property.

P2E bought the DiamondJacks Casino in Bossier City, Louisiana in 2016. The casino closed in 2020 due to the impact of the COVID-19 pandemic. P2E proposed to use the casino license for a new property, the Camellia Bay Resort and Casino, to be built in Slidell, Louisiana, but it was rejected by parish voters. Faced with the threat of revocation of the casino license, P2E agreed in 2022 to sell DiamondJacks to Foundation Gaming.

P2E partnered with other investors in 2018 to purchase Colonial Downs, a defunct horse racing track in Virginia. P2E later bought out its partners' stake in the property. The track reopened in 2019, and P2E opened several satellite facilities with historical racing machines and off-track betting around the state under the Rosie's brand.

In February 2022, P2E agreed to sell the bulk of its assets to Churchill Downs, Inc. for $2.49 billion. The sale would not include DiamondJacks or the Cedar Crossing project. The transaction was completed in November 2022, for a final price of $2.75 billion.

== Properties ==
- DiamondJacks Casino — Bossier City, Louisiana (closed)
- New Hampshire Group — 4 casinos in New Hampshire
  - Wonder Casino
  - Dover Poker Room
  - Filotimo Casino
  - Lebanon Poker Room

=== Former properties ===
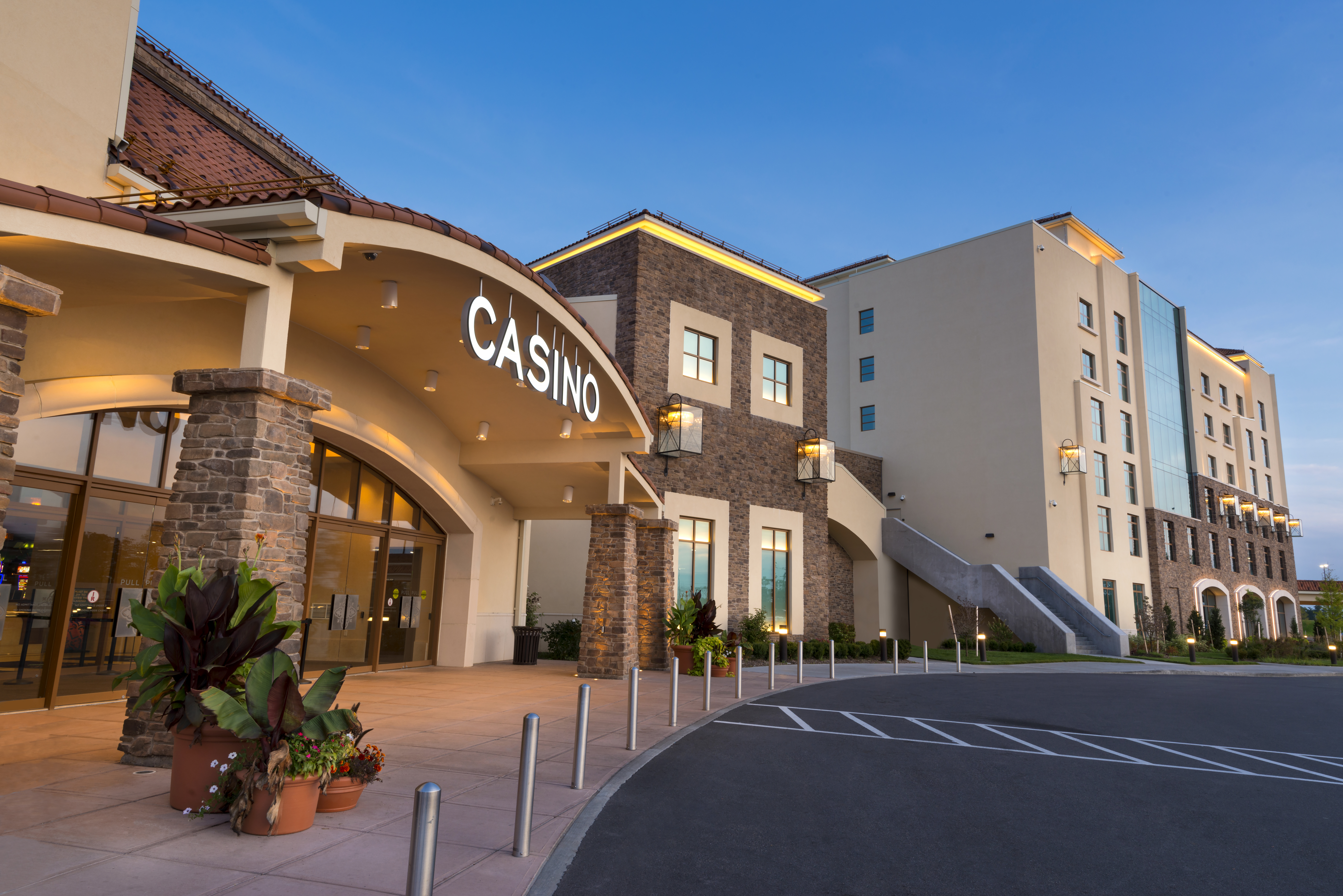
Del Lago Resort and Casino in Tyre, New York

- Amelia Belle Casino — Amelia, Louisiana
- Colonial Downs — New Kent County, Virginia
  - Rosie's Gaming Emporium — 6 locations in Virginia
- Del Lago Resort and Casino — Tyre, New York
- Diamond Jo Dubuque — Dubuque, Iowa
- Diamond Jo Worth — Northwood, Iowa
- Evangeline Downs Racetrack & Casino — Opelousas, Louisiana
  - Off-track betting parlors in Eunice, Henderson, Port Allen, St. Martinville
- Hard Rock Hotel & Casino Sioux City — Sioux City, Iowa
- Kansas Star Casino — Mulvane, Kansas
