= 2010 Louisiana lieutenant gubernatorial special election =

- October 2, 2010 (first round); November 2, 2010 (runoff)
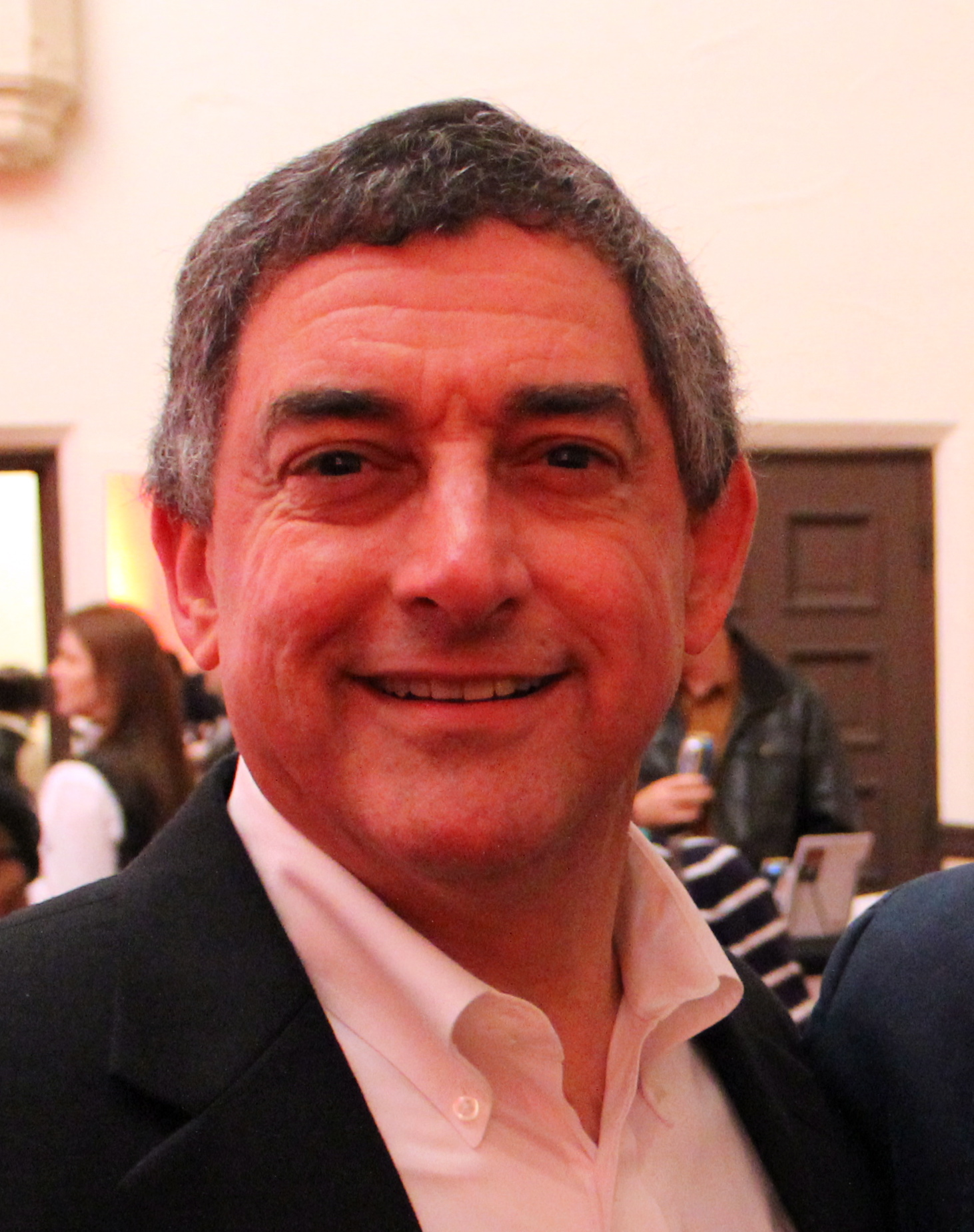

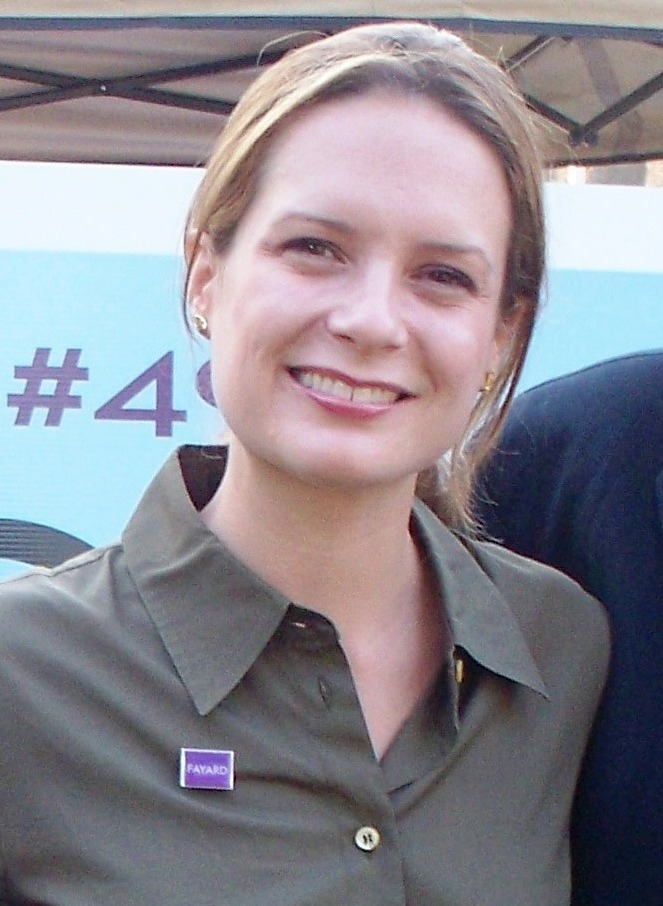

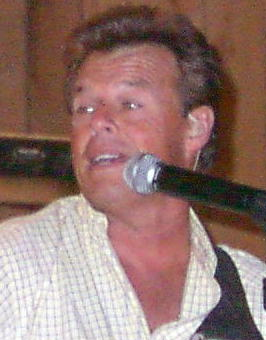
Nominee	Jay Dardenne	Caroline Fayard	Sammy Kershaw
Party	Republican	Democratic	Republican
First round	180,944; 27.61%	159,507; 24.34%	126,166; 19.25%
Runoff	719,271; 57.09%	540,649; 42.91%	Eliminated
Nominee	Kevin Davis	Jim Crowley	Roger Villere
Party	Republican	Democratic	Republican
First round	51,542; 7.86%	51,461; 7.85%	44,096; 6.73%
Runoff	Eliminated	Eliminated	Eliminated
- Dardenne: 20–30% 30–40% 40–50% 50–60% 60–70% 70–80% Fayard: 20–30% 30–40% 40–50% 50–60% 60–70% 70–80% Kershaw: 20–30% 30–40% 40–50% 50–60% Davis: 20–30% 30–40% 40–50% Crowley: 20–30%
Lieutenant Governor before election
Scott Angelle
Democratic
Elected Lieutenant Governor
Jay Dardenne
Republican

The 2010 Louisiana lieutenant gubernatorial special election was held on October 2, 2010, to elect the Lieutenant Governor of Louisiana, with a runoff election held on November 2, 2010. Democratic Lieutenant Governor Mitch Landrieu's election as Mayor of New Orleans created a vacancy, thus necessitating a special election to fill the remainder of the term ending in January 2012. Democrat Scott Angelle was appointed by Republican Governor Bobby Jindal in May to fill the vacancy until the conclusion of the special election.

Angelle agreed to do the job only until it was filled via the special election. On October 2, 2010, a jungle primary pitted Republicans Jay Dardenne, Kevin Davis, Sammy Kershaw, and Roger Villere and Democrats James Crowley, Caroline Fayard, and Butch Gautreaux. Dardenne and Fayard advanced to the general election, which Dardenne won with 57% of the vote.

== Candidates ==
=== Republican Party ===
- Jay Dardenne, Secretary of State of Louisiana
- Sammy Kershaw, musician
- Kevin Davis
- Roger Villere
- Melanie McKnight

=== Democratic Party ===
- Caroline Fayard
- Jim Crowley
- Butch Gautreaux, state senator

== Jungle Primary ==
=== Campaign ===
Throughout the campaign leading up to the primary election, Villere had been especially critical of Dardenne. Thus, Villere's subsequent endorsement of Dardenne was met with incredulous statements like those of political scientist Pearson Cross of the University of Louisiana at Lafayette:

Maybe he thinks that you can at the end of the day say, "Well, we just need to all come together." It just seems odd.

Subsequently, Louisiana Republican Party officials declined to give state party funds to Dardenne's campaign, even as the Louisiana Democratic Party paid $209,936 for a television commercial as an "in-kind donation" supporting Fayard. The Louisiana Republican Party continued to ignore Dardenne's campaign even as the Louisiana Democratic Party raised its support of Fayard to $423,000. Between the primary and the general election, Fayard exceeded Dardenne in both fundraising and spending, a situation fostered significantly by the Louisiana Democratic Party's donations in support of Fayard while the Louisiana Republican Party declined to financially support Dardenne. Ultimately, the Louisiana Democratic Party spent $770,000 on Fayard's campaign. Louisiana's Republican governor Bobby Jindal also declined to involve himself in either the election for lieutenant governor or the election for U.S. Senator between Republican incumbent David Vitter and the challenging Democrat, U.S. Representative Charlie Melancon.

=== Debates ===
Among other discussions, Dardenne and Fayard appeared on the October 15 Louisiana: The State We're In magazine televised by Louisiana Public Broadcasting and on an October 22 forum sponsored by the Baton Rouge League of Women Voters.

=== Results ===
Louisiana Lt. Governor primary election, 2010
Party	Candidate	Votes	%	±%
Republican	Jay Dardenne	180,944	27.61%	
Democratic	Caroline Fayard	159,507	24.34%	
Republican	Sammy Kershaw	126,166	19.25%	
Republican	Kevin Davis	51,542	7.86%	
Democratic	Jim Crowley	51,461	7.85%	
Republican	Roger Villere	44,096	6.73%	
Democratic	Butch Gautreaux	25,289	3.86%	
Republican	Melanie McKnight	16,411	2.50%	
Turnout		655,416		

== Runoff ==
=== Campaign ===
During the runoff campaign between Dardenne and Fayard, Dardenne described Fayard as a supporter of U.S. President Barack Obama and same-sex marriage and an opponent of the death penalty. Fayard, who was 32 years of age and had never held political office, attempted to deflect the Republican tide by claiming that Dardenne represented the legacy of Louisiana politics. Times-Picayune columnist Stephanie Grace opined that

Washington-style partisanship so dominates the mood this season that it's even bleeding into the contest for lieutenant governor.

Besides prior campaign contributions to Hillary Clinton, John Kerry, former state senator Cleo Fields, and former U.S. Representative William J. Jefferson, a Dardenne commercial criticized Fayard's previous employment by Goldman Sachs, which later received a federal bailout. Fayard came after Dardenne for "earning outside income" by maintaining a law practice, which Dardenne said was only for "some limited legal work for longtime clients and some mediation work, but not on state time." When Fayard pledged to spend "110 percent" of her time as lieutenant governor, Dardenne called Fayard's pledge "a cheap political stunt."

In the October 22 forum sponsored by the Baton Rouge League of Women Voters, Fayard continued to knock Dardenne's outside income, and Dardenne responded that Fayard had voted in just seven of the previous 14 elections. In response to Dardenne's question on where the money came from when she lent her campaign over $400,000 but had indicated her 2009 income as less than $80,000, Fayard responded that she had followed "every ethical rule" and that the money came from "success."

Television commercials by the two candidates intensified in number and acrimony during the week before the runoff. A Darden commercial criticized Fayard's assigning, in response to a forum question, a grade of "B+" to President Barack Obama's performance while "F" was the grade assigned by Dardenne.

In the backdrop of Dardenne's high name recognition and established reputation and the uphill battle many Democrats were facing around the country in the 2010 elections, the Think Tank with Garland Robinette talk radio program speculated that Fayard, as a savvy candidate, had little or nothing to lose in the lieutenant governor race and that she might prove to be the most effective candidate the Louisiana Democratic Party could offer in 2011 as an alternative to Republican governor Bobby Jindal. The discussion cited Jindal's high approval ratings and already in-the-bank $7 million campaign fund as unapproachable assets for Democrats other than Fayard. Fayard did not run, and the leading Democrat in the 2011 race was Tara Hollis of Thibodaux with 17% of the vote.

=== Results ===
Dardenne won the November 2 election. Darden's was sworn in as lieutenant governor on November 22, 2010.

Louisiana Lt. Governor runoff election, 2010
Party	Candidate	Votes	%	±%
Republican	Jay Dardenne	719,271	57.09%	
Democratic	Caroline Fayard	540,649	42.91%	
Turnout		1,259,920		

== See also ==
- 2010 United States gubernatorial elections
- Lieutenant Governor of Louisiana
