= Robert Allain III =

American politician

Member of the Louisiana Senate from the 21st district
- Incumbent
- Assumed office January 8, 2024
- Preceded by: Bret Allain

Personal details
- Party: Republican

Robert Allain III is an American politician from Louisiana. A Republican, Allain represents District 21 in the Louisiana State Senate, preceded by his father, Bret Allain.

Louisiana State Senate
Preceded by Bret Allain	Member of the Louisiana Senate from the 21st district 2024-	Incumbent
