= Diamond Jim (disambiguation) =

Diamond Jim is a 1935 American biographical film.

Diamond Jim may also refer to:

- Diamond Jim Brady (1856–1917), American businessman, financier and philanthropist
- Diamond Jim Fisk (1835–1872), American stockbroker and corporate executive
- Diamond Jim Purcell (1909–1968), American police chief in Portland, Oregon

== Other uses ==
- Felicity's Diamond Jim (2000–2011), an English Springer Spaniel who was the 2007 Best In Show winner at the Westminster Dog Show

== See also ==
- Diamond (given name)
- Diamond Joe (disambiguation)
- James Diamond (disambiguation)
