= Q Casino =

Combination greyhound race track and casino located in Dubuque, Iowa, US

Coordinates: 42.51701°N 90.644208°W

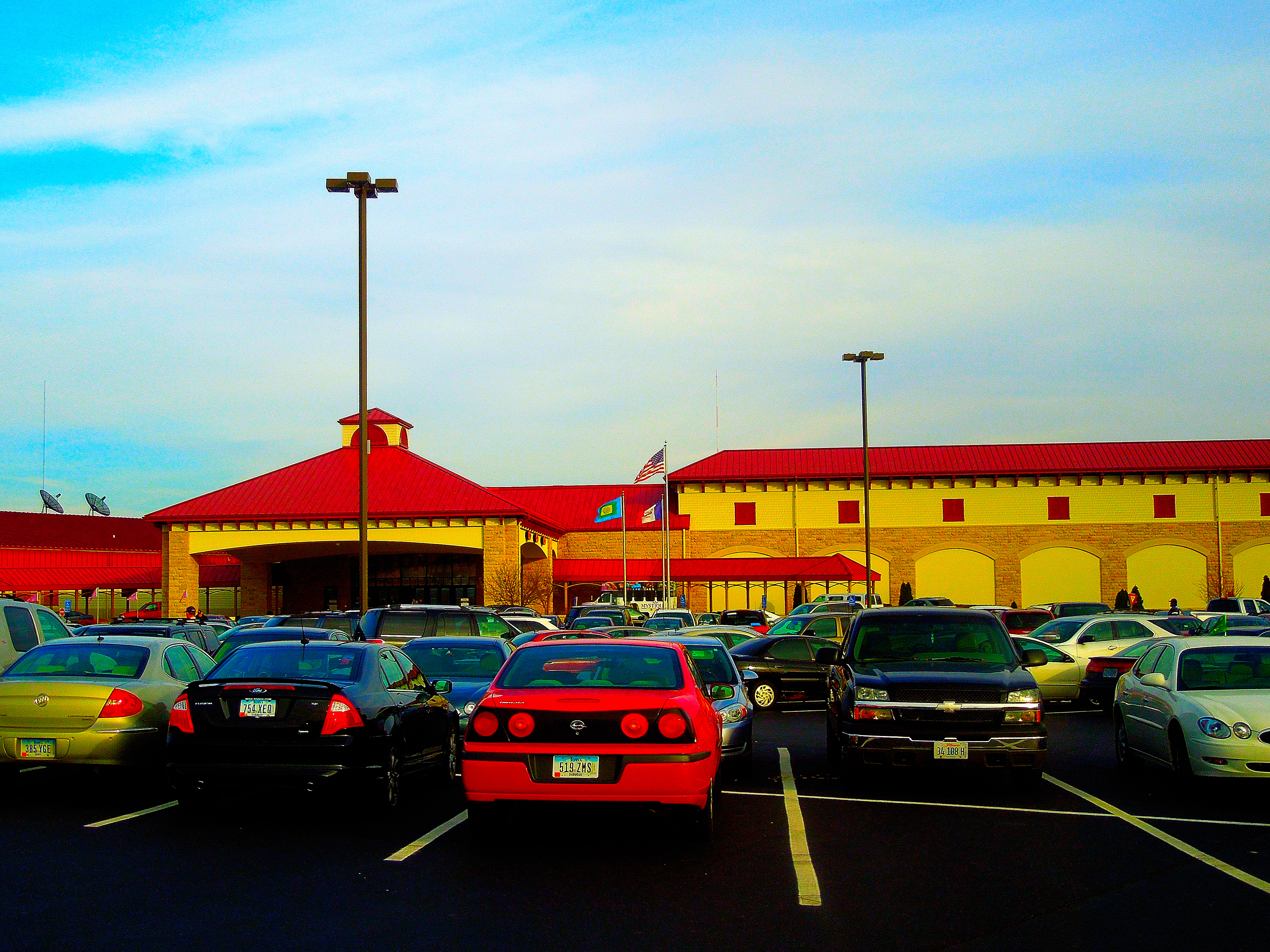
- Q Casino (then Mystique) in 2012
- Interactive map of Q Casino
- Location: Dubuque, Iowa; 1855 Greyhound Park Drive
- Opened: June 1, 1985
- Theme: French
- No. of rooms: 116 @ the Hilton Garden Inn
- Gaming space: 29,600 sq ft (2,750 m^{2})
- Permanent shows: Cabaret; Encore Stage
- Signature attractions: Greyhound racing (1985-2022)
- Notable restaurants: Houlihan's
- Casino type: Land-based
- Owner: City of Dubuque
- Previous names: Dubuque Greyhound Park (1985-1995); Dubuque Greyhound Park & Casino (1995-2009); Mystique (2009-2017)
- Renovated in: 1995, 2005, 2009
- Public transit access: Pink The Jule
- Website: qcasinoandhotel.com

Q Casino (formerly Mystique and Dubuque Greyhound Park & Casino) is a casino located in Dubuque, Iowa. It also was a greyhound race track until racing ceased there on May 15, 2022. The facility is operated by the non-profit Dubuque Racing Association, its license holder. It is a member of the Iowa Gaming Association, and shares a gaming license with the Diamond Jo Dubuque casino. Beginning operations on June 1, 1985, the track became a full-service casino following the introduction of table games in 2005.

Q Casino is located on Chaplain Schmitt Island, near the Mississippi River. The casino, along with attractions in the Port of Dubuque and Downtown Dubuque, have helped to create a large and growing tourism market in Dubuque.

== Casino ==
Q Casino is the larger of Dubuque's two casinos, with 29,600 square feet (2,750 m^{2}) of gaming space. It has 1,000 slot, keno, and video poker machines, and table games including Blackjack, Craps, Roulette, Three Card Poker, Four Card Poker, Pai Gow poker, Let It Ride, Texas Hold 'em and Ultimate Texas Hold'em. The operation also has four restaurants—the Champagne Steakhouse, Bon Appetit Buffet, The Players Club Sports Bar, and The Players Club Express in the greyhound track seating area, and Houlihan's adjacent to the facility. The casino features two entertainment venues—the "Cabaret" venue for national and 'tribute' musical performers plus the Bonkerz Comedy Club, and the "Encore" stage in the casino for local musical acts.

== History ==
With the onset of the "Farm Crisis", and a successive economic recession, the Iowa State Legislature passed the Pari-mutuel Wagering Act in 1984, with the hope of jumpstarting the state's economy. The bill permitted the opening of horse and greyhound race tracks in Iowa. A group of Dubuque citizens, originally affiliated with the city's convention and visitors bureau, formed the independent, non-profit Dubuque Racing Association to study the feasibility of opening a race track in Dubuque. In April 1984, a 20-year, $7.9 million bond referendum was put before the voters, and passed with a 70% majority.

The following year, on June 1, 1985, the Dubuque Greyhound Park opened as Iowa's first pari-mutuel race track, and as the first non-profit greyhound race track in the nation. The facility's bonds were paid off in May 1991, 14 years ahead of schedule. In 1994, the Iowa Legislature passed another bill, allowing for the installation of slot machines at land-based casinos in the state. The Dubuque operation did so in November 1995, renaming itself the Dubuque Greyhound Park & Casino.

Iowa law requires that county voters re-approve gambling every eight years. In 2002, Dubuque County voters re-approved gambling in the county with over 80% in support.

In 2009, Dubuque Greyhound Park & Casino was renamed Mystique. A $10 million renovation includes incorporating a French theme throughout the casino, as well as adding a new steakhouse, buffet, and entertainment area.

In March 2017, Mystique was again rebranded as Q Casino, to avert a trademark lawsuit by the Mystic Lake Casino.

In October 2021, it was announced that greyhound racing would cease after one final 18-day season from April to May 2022. The final race was held on May 16, 2022. Extensive redevelopments of the racetrack property and the larger Chaplain Schmitt Island are in the works.

== Expansion ==
On the eve of its 20th anniversary, in May 2005, the casino completed a $33 million expansion and renovation project, tripling the size of the gaming floor to 29,000 square feet (2,700 m^{2}). The facility also became a full-service casino, by adding table games and a poker room for the first time. The expansion greatly increased the casino's market share, with attendance rising to over a million visitors in the following year.

That same year, a 116-room Hilton Garden Inn was built adjacent to the casino, along with a Houlihan's Restaurant.
