= Diamond Joe (African American folk song) =

African American folk song

- African American folk song
- Genre: Folk music
- Published: Traditional; first noted in 1909
- Recorded: April 15, 1926, Darien, Georgia

"Diamond Joe" is an African American folk song, known from early 20th-century collections and recordings, featuring the chorus "Diamond Joe, come and get me, Diamond Joe". It is listed as number 3585 in the Roud Folk Song Index. It is distinct from the cowboy song "Diamond Joe" about a ranch owner named Diamond Joe.

The song was first documented in the early 1900s in Mississippi around 1910. Early recordings include a 1926 recording by A. Wilson, a 1927 commercial recording by the Georgia Crackers, and 1937 and 1939 field recordings of Charlie Butler at the Mississippi State Penitentiary made by John and Ruby Lomax. As part of the folk revival movement, the song was later recorded by Wilma Lee and Stoney Cooper, Harry Belafonte, Jerry Garcia, and Bob Dylan, among others.

The meaning of the song is disputed by folklorists, with Diamond Joe sometimes seen as referring to a savior or redeemer who can provide money to the singer, a line of steamboats that will take the singer away from current trouble, a future employer that can help the singer, or a former friend that the singer misses.

== History ==
=== First references ===
The earliest known occurrence of the refrain was published by E. C. Perrow in Songs and Rhymes from the South in 1915 from a 1909 manuscript, citing a Mr. Turner in Mississippi. It is categorized as a song connected with drinking and gambling and its refrain was recorded as "Diamond Joe, Diamond Joe, Run get me Diamond Joe." The text portrayed a dice game in which winning the game will allow the singer to buy food to eat.

A contemporary version of the refrain was recorded by Howard W. Odum in the Journal of American Folklore in 1911 under the name "Diamon' Joe". He classified it as a love song and it was notably sung by a woman. Its refrain was recorded as "Diamon' Joe com'n git me."

In 1925, Dorothy Scarborough printed the African American blues ballad "Duncan and Brady" featuring Diamond Joe as a gambling character.

If I come out on two, Then I'll hand em back to you.
Chorus: Diamond Joe, Diamond Joe, Run get me Diamond Joe.
If I come out on three, Then you'll hand em back to me.
If I come out on fo', Then I'll beat you a dolla mo.
If I come out on six, Then you knows yo money's fixed.
If I come out on seben, Then I'll roll you fer eleben.
If I come out on nine, Then yo money will be mine.
Then I'll buy me a bar'l o' flour, Cook and eat it every hour.
Yes; an buy me a middlin' o' meat, Cook and eat it twict a week.

— E. C. Perrow, "Songs and Rhymes from the South," The Journal of American Folklore (1915)

Diamon' Joe, you better come an' git me:
Don't you see my man done qu..?
Diamon' Joe com'n git me.
Diamon' Joe he had a wife, they parted every night;
When the weather it got cool,
Ole Joe he come back to that black gal.
But time come to pass, When old Joe quit his last,
An' he never went to see her any mo'.

— Howard W. Odum, Journal of American Folklore (1911)

Twinkle, twinkle, little star,
Brady come down on — Gabriel car,
Kickin' out windows and knockin' out doors,
Tryin' to play even with Diamond Joe!
Been on a jolly so long!

— Dorothy Scarborough, On the Trail of Negro Folk-Songs (1925)

=== Early recordings ===
Robert Winslow Gordon made the first recordings of "Diamond Joe" in the spring of 1926 in Darien, Georgia with two African American singers. The first, by A. Wilson, was recorded on April 15, 1926. The second was on May 3, 1926. The recording by Wilson sang of "buying a ham and a "middlin' of meat"", a shared lyric with Perrow's writings. Gordon grouped "Diamond Joe" with "Duncan and Brady" as "underworld or 'outlaw' songs".

A version was recorded by the Georgia Crackers (three white men - Paul Cofer, Leon Cofer on banjo, and Ben Evans on guitar) for Okeh Records on March 21, 1927. While Paul Cofer and Leon Cofer usually recorded as the Cofer Brothers, they performed as the Georgia Crackers for a session that included "Diamond Joe" as well as material that The Village Voice critic David Wondrich called blackface "coon song".

The song was recorded by John Lomax on March 8, 1937, sung by Charlie Butler at the Mississippi State Penitentiary, as part of Lomax's third recording trip to Parchman Farm. A second recording of the song by Charlie Butler was recorded by John Lomax and Ruby Terrill Lomax as part of their 1939 Southern States Recording Trip on May 24, 1939, Lomax's fourth and last recording trip to Parchman Farm. Butler's recordings have the same chorus as the Georgia Crackers version but a different set of verses, with the refrain written as "Diamond Joe, come a-gittin' me, Diamond Joe". The notes from the CD release of the 1937 recording described the words as being improvised by every singer, with the melody, referred to as the "holler", being distinct to Butler and this song.

Alan Lomax, the son of John Lomax, recorded a performance of the song by Bessie Jones on October 6, 1961, at his apartment in New York City.

=== Folk revival ===
Tex Logan encountered the Georgia Crackers recording of "Diamond Joe" in 1944 or 1945 while at Texas Tech University, and in 1956 he wrote a new fiddle version based on it. This version was recorded by Wilma Lee and Stoney Cooper in 1957 on banjo and steel guitar. Logan played the song in a group with Peter Rowan in the 1970s.

Harry Belafonte covered "Diamond Joe" in his 1960 album Swing Dat Hammer, which won the Grammy Award for Best Ethnic or Traditional Folk Recording. Cary Ginell described the song as "one of the most chilling performances of [Belafonte's] career." The New Lost City Ramblers recorded a version of the song in 1963.

Jerry Garcia also recorded a version of "Diamond Joe" in 1987 with the Jerry Garcia Acoustic Band, crediting Tex Logan as the source from whom David Grisman learned the track; Grisman had been a former bandmate of Peter Rowan.

Bob Dylan covered it for the soundtrack for Masked and Anonymous in 2003, based on the Georgia Cracker's recording; this is separate from the recording of the cowboy song "Diamond Joe" that Dylan also covered. Windborne covered the track as a prison song in their album Lay Around That Shack.

== Interpretation ==
Gospel and folk singer Bessie Jones, who performed it for Alan Lomax in 1961, described it as "about a person in trouble" and saying that "Diamond Joe is just the one who's got some money ... Anyone that got money come an' git me. 'Cause Diamond Joe, I need to come home!"

Alan Lomax described Perrow's Diamond Joe text as a song that a gambler on a losing streak would sing, saying that, in the South, African American men would sometimes depend on a friendship with white men for personal safety.

William Brook Barlow describes Diamond Joe as referring to a redeemer figure that helps resist antebellum slavery and "its prison-farm legacy".

Art Thieme, after spending three years performing upon a steamboat on the Illinois River, proposed that the song refers to the Diamond Jo line of steamboats, which was owned by Joseph "Diamond Jo" Reynolds and operated from 1862 to 1911. Researcher Lyle Lofgren also supported this meaning, as did Gus Meade, who stated that it "was probably addressed not to a person, but a steamboat." Researcher and musician Stephen Wade, however, noted that the Diamond Jo line did not operate in the South, and had shut down long before Butler's recording, and found it unlikely that Charlie Butler's recording related to steamboats. Thieme later stated that "I am possibly wrong about my steamboat connection idea".

Marilyn Corbin, who was an administrative assistant at Parchman Farm for twenty one years beginning in the 1970s, interpreted Butler's recording as an inmate calling for a future employer, as parole boards looked favorably on prisoners who had a job offer lined up for after release.

Tex Logan described the Georgia Crackers' "Diamond Joe" as being about a former friend of the singer, with whom the singer wants to return to this former friendship after the loss of the singer's wife.
