= Carla Blanchard Dartez =

American politician

Member of the Louisiana House of Representatives from the 51st district
- In office January 2000 – 2008
- Preceded by: Dudley Anthony "Butch" Gautreaux
- Succeeded by: Joe Harrison

Personal details
- Born: September 1965 (age 60)
- Party: Democratic
- Spouse: Lenny J. Dartez

Carla Blanchard Dartez (born September 1965) is a Democratic former member of the Louisiana House of Representatives from District 51 (Assumption, St. Mary, and Terrebonne parishes). She was first elected to that office in 1999 and took her seat in January 2000.

In 2007, Dartez came to national attention after remarks she made calling a civil rights activist "Buckwheat" after a campaign event became public. The term, in reference to the Little Rascals character of the same name, is considered a racial slur. Dartez apologized. The local chapter of the NAACP threw its support behind her Republican opponent, Joe Harrison of Napoleonville in Assumption Parish, in the general election held on November 17, 2007. Dartez polled 3,276 votes to Harrison's 4,338.

Dartez retired in 2008. She resides in Morgan City in St. Mary Parish.
