= The District Leader =

- Music: Joseph E. Howard
- Lyrics: Joseph E. Howard
- Book: Joseph E. Howard
- Productions: 1906 Broadway

The District Leader is a musical that premiered in New York City on April 30, 1906, at Wallack's Theatre and closed on May 5, 1906, after eight performances. Music, lyrics, and book were by Joseph E. Howard.

== Show ==
The show is set in New York City and is in two acts.

== Song list ==
- Act 1
  - One and One Make One - Grace Lowton and Chorus
  - A Heart to Let - Florrie Fenshaw and Tom Cole
- Act 2
  - Sing Sung Sammy - The Belle of Chinatown and Chorus
  - What's the Use of Dreaming - Jim Halloran and Chorus
  - Old Broadway - Mr. Partridge and Chorus
  - The Big Banshee - Jack Dunning and Chorus
  - Union Square - Chinese Maidens

== Cast and crew ==
The show was staged by Howard, set design by Meixner and Frank Platzer, and costume design by M. Simowitch and Mme. Osborne. The cast included Joseph Allen as Dan Lowton, Miss Barnes as Chinese Maiden, Fred J. Barnes as Mr. Partridge, Allen Bennett as Clinton Goddard, William S. Davis as Willie Carter, Diamond Donner as Florrie Fenshaw, Miss Dupree as Chinese Maiden, Ida Emerson as Valeska Granger, Marie Fanchonetti as Chinese Maiden, Miss. Gordon as Chinese Maiden, Mark Hart as Sam Grady, Joseph E. Howard as Jack Dunning, Leonard B. Hoyt as Hop Lee, Gertrude Jenkins as Chinese Maiden, Dave Lewis as Tom Cole, Charles M. McDonald as Ezra Whittle, Miss O'Neill as Chinese Maiden, Leona Pam as The Belle of Chinatown, Miss Porter as Chinese Maiden, Florence Sinnott as Grace Lowton, Miss Stockwell as Chinese Maiden, E. G. Stockwell as Dutch, Harry Stone as Tim Halloran/Jim Halloran, Mark Sullivan as The Man Who Wants to Bet, Miss Urmazy as Chinese Maiden, and Miss West as Chinese Maiden.
