= Bret Allain =

American politician

R. L. "Bret" Allain II

Member of the Louisiana Senate from the 21st district
- In office January 9, 2012 – January 8, 2024
- Preceded by: Butch Gautreaux
- Succeeded by: Robert Allain III

Personal details
- Born: Robert Lebreton Allain II; November 18, 1958 (age 67) Bayou Teche, Louisiana
- Party: Republican
- Spouse: Kimberly Allain
- Children: 3
- Education: Louisiana State University (BA)
- Occupation: Farmer/businessman

Robert Lebreton Allain II is an American politician from Adeline, Louisiana. A Republican, Allain represented District 21 in the Louisiana State Senate from 2012 to 2024. His son Robert ran to succeed him.

== Career ==
Before entering elected office, Allain was the President of the Adeline Planting Company. Allain founded the sugarcane farm in 1997. Allain won 51.36% of the vote in the October 22, 2011 jungle primary over Republican Darrin Guidry. Allain ran unopposed in 2014 and 2019.

Louisiana State Senate
Preceded by Butch Gautreaux	Member of the Louisiana Senate from the 21st district 2012–2024	Succeeded by Robert Allain III
