= Del Lago Resort and Casino =

Casino hotel in Tyre, New York

del Lago Resort and Casino
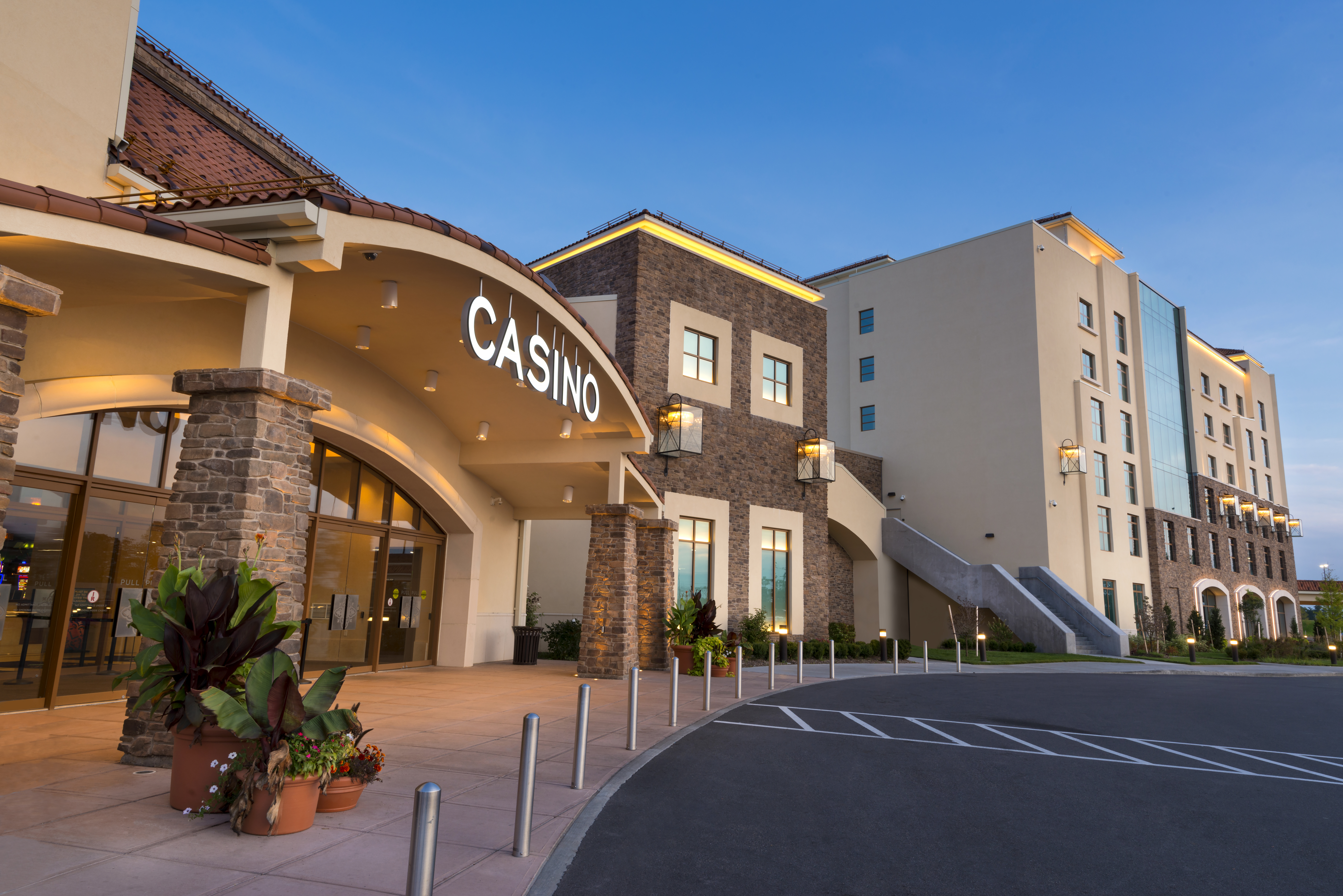

- Location in central New York
- Interactive map of del Lago Resort and Casino
- Location: Tyre, New York; 1133 New York State Route 414; 42.969°N 76.845°W
- Opened: February 1, 2017; 9 years ago
- Theme: Italian Villa
- No. of rooms: 205
- Gaming space: 100,000 sq. ft.
- Notable restaurants: Portico by Fabio Viviani
- Casino type: Land-based
- Owner: Churchill Downs, Inc.
- Website: dellagoresort.com

Del Lago Resort and Casino is a casino hotel in Tyre, New York, owned and operated by Churchill Downs, Inc. It opened in 2017 at a cost of $440 million.

== Facilities ==
The casino features 1,702 slot machines, 66 table games, and 14 poker tables.

The property has nine restaurants and bars, a spa, and several retail outlets.

The resort's entertainment venue, The Vine, has 2,400 seats, and hosts various concerts throughout the year, as well as a weekly comedy night.

The parking lot features a 10 stall Tesla supercharger station.

== History ==
In 2011, former New York State governor Andrew Cuomo announced his administration's intent to license casinos in upstate New York to compete with Native American tribal casinos. However, this was contingent upon legislation that needed to pass. Cuomo came to an agreement with the legislature in 2013 to allow the casinos to operate, and then sought to locate three sites for the upstate casinos.

Wilmorite announced its proposal for the Wilmot Casino & Resort in December 2013. In 2014, Peninsula Pacific Entertainment joined the project as an investor, and the name was changed to Lago Resort & Casino.

The casino's location was subject to a battery of lawsuits from 2015 to the time of its construction. There were concerns over competing interests with the Finger Lakes casinos, racinos, and the casinos operated by the Oneida Indian Nation.

The casino opened on February 1, 2017.

Peninsula Pacific agreed in 2019 to buy out Wilmorite's stake in Del Lago, becoming the sole owner of the property.

In 2022, Peninsula Pacific sold the bulk of its assets, including Del Lago, to Churchill Downs, Inc.
