= Hard Rock Hotel & Casino Sioux City =

Integrated resort in Iowa, United States

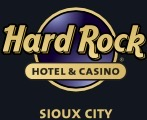

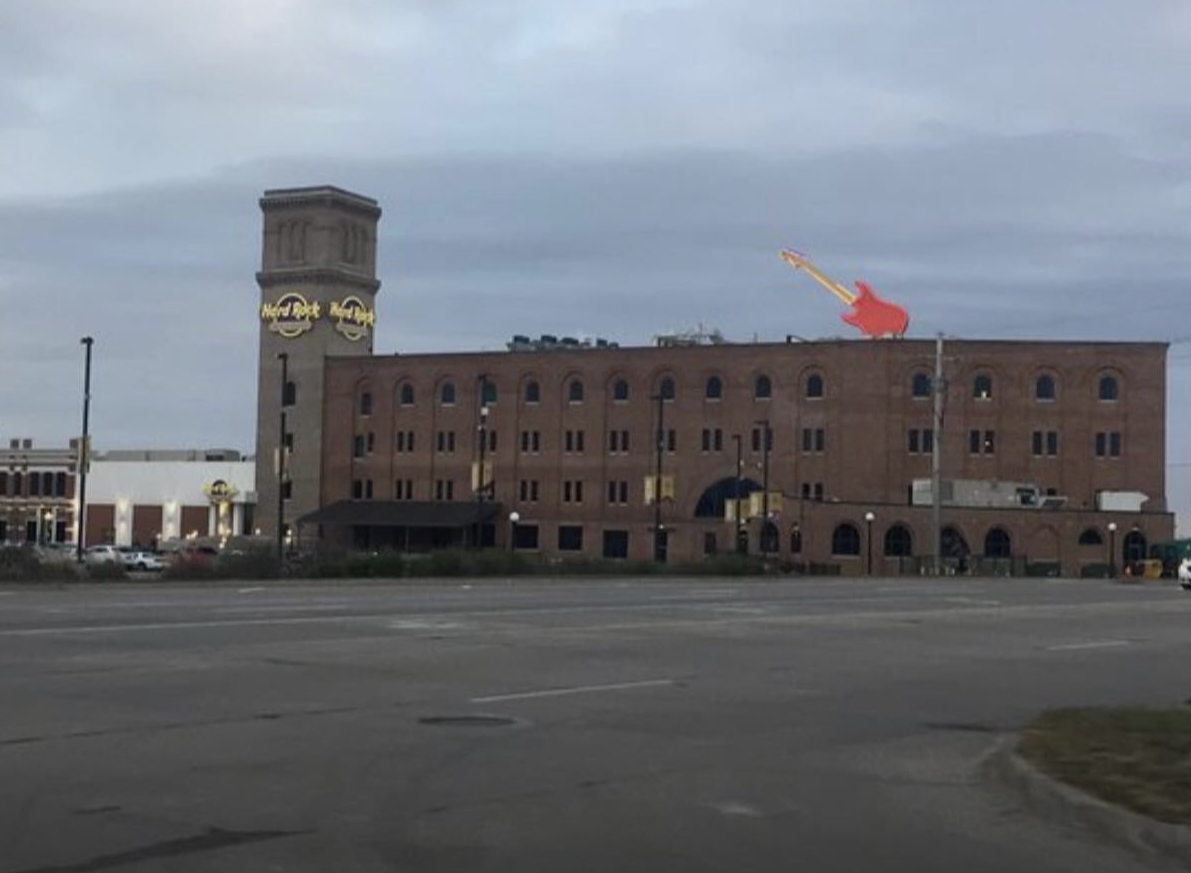
- Exterior view (November 2019)
- Interactive map of Hard Rock Hotel & Casino Sioux City
- Location: Sioux City, Iowa; 111 3rd Street, 51101; 42°29′36″N 96°24′42″W
- Opened: August 1, 2014; 12 years ago
- Theme: Rock and roll
- No. of rooms: 54
- Gaming space: 45,000 square feet (4,200 m^{2})
- Signature attractions: Anthem; Battery Park
- Notable restaurants: World Tour Buffet; Main + Abbey; Fuel American Grill
- Casino type: Land-based
- Owner: Churchill Downs, Inc.
- Operating license holder: Missouri River Historical Development, Inc.
- Architect: Friedmutter Group
- Website: Official website
- Building details

Design and construction
- Developer: Warner Gaming

Hard Rock Hotel & Casino Sioux City is an integrated resort in Sioux City, Iowa, inside the historic Battery Building. As of February 2022, it is owned and operated by Churchill Downs, Inc., though it is pending an ownership change as of July 2026. The property was developed by Warner Gaming, former manager of the Las Vegas Hard Rock, and, as a result, Hard Rock International only licenses their name; the resort does not feature a Hard Rock Cafe or Hard Rock Live, and instead features the indoor concert venue Anthem, and an outdoor concert venue known as Battery Park.

== History ==
=== Background ===
Constructed between 1905 and 1906, the six-story Romanesque building, commonly known as the Battery Building, originally served as a distribution hub for the St. Louis, Missouri–based Simmons Hardware Company, developed by Frank Bunker Gilbreth, Sr. and designed by Gordon, Tracy and Swartwout. In 1939, the building housed the Kollman-Warner Seed Company, and was leased to the Sioux City Battery Corporation in 1944. The building was acquired by local farm retail firm Bomgaars, which vacated in 2005 and left it abandoned.

=== 2012–2014: Development and opening ===
In October 2012, Warner Gaming, the operator of the Hard Rock Hotel & Casino Las Vegas at the time, announced to convert the abandoned Battery Building into a Hard Rock Casino, which would cost $100 million to develop. The architect for the project would be the Friedmutter Group; the developers planned to mount a 50-foot electric guitar on the historic clock tower, but structural limitations caused it to be placed onto a different rooftop pole.

The plan was later modified to include a boutique hotel component. The Hard Rock was one of four applications submitted for the one available casino license in Woodbury County, competing against a bid from Ho-Chunk Inc. and two bids from Penn National Gaming. Peninsula Pacific Entertainment joined as an investor in the project in January 2013. In April 2013, the Iowa Racing and Gaming Commission (IRGC) selected the Hard Rock over the other proposals.

=== 2014–present: Grand opening and after ===
The resort had its grand opening on August 1, 2014 at 8:00 p.m. CDT in downtown Sioux City, featuring a ceremonial guitar smash held by Mayor Bob Scott, Warner Hospitality CEO Bill Warner, General Manager Todd Moyer, and MRHD President Mark Monson. Aaron Lewis rolled the first dice, and privately played at the resort's new live entertainment venue, Anthem, and the building featured the Rock Shop, over 835 slot machines, and music memorabilia. The casino is land-based, as Iowa no longer requires casinos to be built on riverboats. The opening came after some controversy and a lawsuit from the now-defunct Argosy Casino Sioux City, who would have its license revoked by the Iowa Racing & Gaming Commission in October 2013.

Peninsula Pacific bought out Warner's stake in the property on October 15, 2020. In February 2022, Peninsula Pacific sold the bulk of its assets, including the Hard Rock, to Churchill Downs, Inc. The resort celebrated its 10th anniversary on August 1, 2024, and at the time, hosted 700 indoor concerts at Anthem, 53 major music festivals at the outdoor Battery Park venue, and over $210 million given to 95,000 jackpots. On July 29, 2026, Form 8-K, filed by Churchill Downs, indicates that the resort might be put on sale.

== Features ==
The 45,000 sq ft (4,200 m^{2}) gaming floor consists of over 850 slot machines and 25 table games. The hotel, housed in the historic Battery Building, has 54 rooms. There are two restaurants: Main + Abbey and Fuel American Grill. Sports betting was legalized in Iowa in August 2019, and Hard Rock began accepting bets on September 20, 2019.

== See also ==
- List of casinos in Iowa
- Hard Rock Hotel & Casino Tulsa
