= Louisiana's 21st State Senate district =

American legislative district

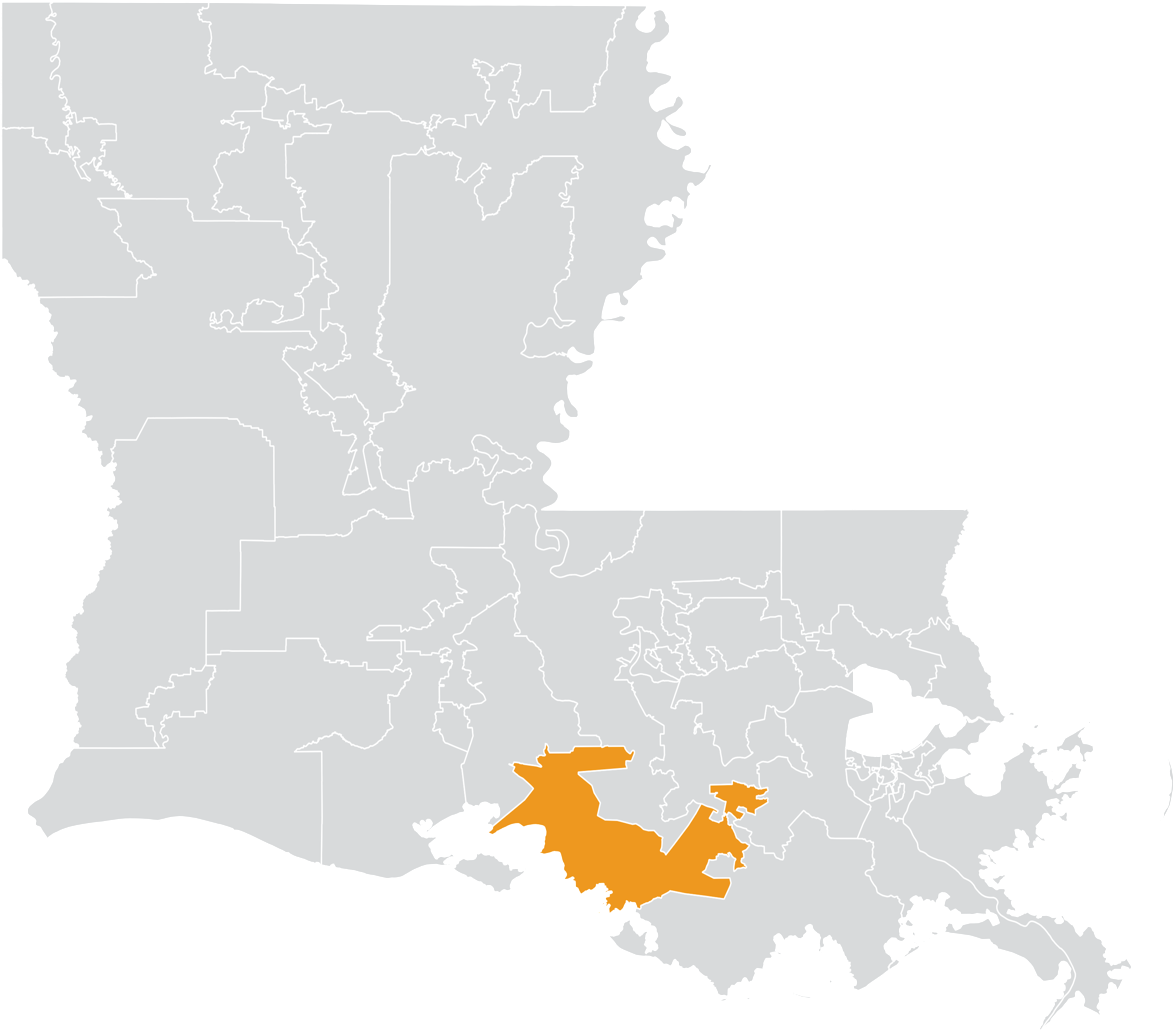
Senator
Bret Allain; R–Adeline
- Registration: 38.3% Democratic; 33.7% Republican; 28.0% No party preference
- Demographics: 63% White; 25% Black; 6% Hispanic; 1% Asian; 2% Native American; 3% Other
- Population (2019): 121,467
- Registered voters: 75,111

Louisiana's 21st State Senate district is one of 39 districts in the Louisiana State Senate. It has been represented by Republican Bret Allain since 2012.

== Geography ==
District 21 covers all of St. Mary Parish and parts of Iberia, Lafourche, and Terrebonne Parishes along the Gulf of Mexico in Acadiana, including some or all of Thibodaux, Houma, Morgan City, Berwick, Patterson, Franklin, Baldwin, Bayou Vista, and Jeanerette.

The district overlaps with Louisiana's 1st, 3rd, and 6th congressional districts, and with the 46th, 49th, 50th, 51st, 52nd, 53rd, and 55th districts of the Louisiana House of Representatives.

== Recent election results ==
Louisiana uses a jungle primary system. If no candidate receives 50% in the first round of voting, when all candidates appear on the same ballot regardless of party, the top-two finishers advance to a runoff election.

=== 2019 ===
2019 Louisiana State Senate election, District 21
Party	Candidate	Votes	%
Republican	Bret Allain (incumbent)	Unopposed	100
Total votes		Unopposed	100
Republican hold			

=== 2015 ===
2015 Louisiana State Senate election, District 21
Party	Candidate	Votes	%
Republican	Bret Allain (incumbent)	Unopposed	100
Total votes		Unopposed	100
Republican hold			

=== 2011 ===
2011 Louisiana State Senate election, District 21
Party	Candidate	Votes	%
Republican	Bret Allain	14,618	51.4
Republican	Darrin Guidry	13,846	48.6
Total votes		28,464	100
Republican gain from Democratic			

=== Federal and statewide results ===
Year	Office	Results
2020	President	Trump 68.7–29.8%
2019	Governor (runoff)	Rispone 59.5–40.5%
2016	President	Trump 67.5–29.9%
2015	Governor (runoff)	Vitter 52.2–47.8%
2014	Senate (runoff)	Cassidy 61.5–38.5%
2012	President	Romney 64.3–34.2%
