= Gus Meade =

American folklorist of early country music

Guthrie "Gus" Turner Meade Jr. (May 17, 1932 – February 8, 1991) was an American folklorist of early country music and Kentucky fiddle music.

== Early life and education ==
Meade was born in Louisville, Kentucky to Sarah Isabel Ballard and Guthrie Turner Meade Sr.

== Career ==
Meade served in the US Air Force where he started his career as a computer programmer and systems analyst. In 1965, he began working at the Library of Congress Folk Music Archives. During the summers, Meade would travel to Kentucky to record and research Kentucky fiddlers, as well as conduct interviews.

For the remainder of his life, Meade researched and collaborated with other fiddle and traditional folk music scholars, annotating a comprehensive discography of some 14,500 recordings. This work was published in "Country Music Sources", which was finalized and published shortly after his death in 1991. The Guthrie T. Meade Collection is housed in the Southern Folklife Collection in the University of North Carolina at Chapel Hill Library.
