= James Diamond =

James Diamond may refer to:

- Jim Diamond (singer) (1951–2015), Scottish songwriter and singer
  - Jim Diamond (1988 album)
  - Jim Diamond (1993 album)
- Jim Diamond (music producer) (born 1965), studio engineer
- James H. Diamond (1925–1945), US Army soldier and Medal of Honor recipient
- James Diamond, a character in Big Time Rush, played by James Maslow
- James Diamond (cinematographer) (1894–1936), American cinematographer
