= Shyyell Diamond Sanchez-McCray =

American drag performer and activist

- Born: 1983/1984
- Died: March 13, 2026 (aged 42); Petersburg, Virginia, US
- Other names: Saamel; Mable
- Occupations: Activist; Drag performer

Shyyell Diamond Sanchez-McCray (1983/1984 – March 13, 2026) was an American drag performer and activist who was murdered in 2026.

== Career ==
Sanchez-McCray worked as a club promoter and drag queen, competing in drag pageants around the United States. He won the Miss Mayflower EOY pageant in 2015. In 2017, he was the second alternate to Miss North Carolina Mardis Gras. He was active in Virginia and in Charlotte, North Carolina, where he was involved in the Charlotte Black Pride pageant circuit and won the Miss Charlotte FFI-at-Large pageant in 2020.

He worked with the Nationz Pageantry system and also ran a catering company.

In 2023, Sanchez-McCray boycotted Bar at 316, an LGBTQ+ sports bar in Charlotte that was reportedly mistreating Black patrons.

== Murder ==
On March 13, 2026, Sanchez-McCray was shot and killed in Petersburg, Virginia. He was forty-two years old at the time of his murder. Police officers responded to the shooting and found his body, with multiple gunshot wounds, inside a house with an unsecured door. He was pronounced dead at the scene and was misgendered as a trans woman in initial news reports. His family later stated he identified as a gay man.

His funeral was scheduled to take place on March 27, 2026, at Johnson Celebration of Life Center in Petersburg, Virginia.
