= Beryl Amedee =

American politician

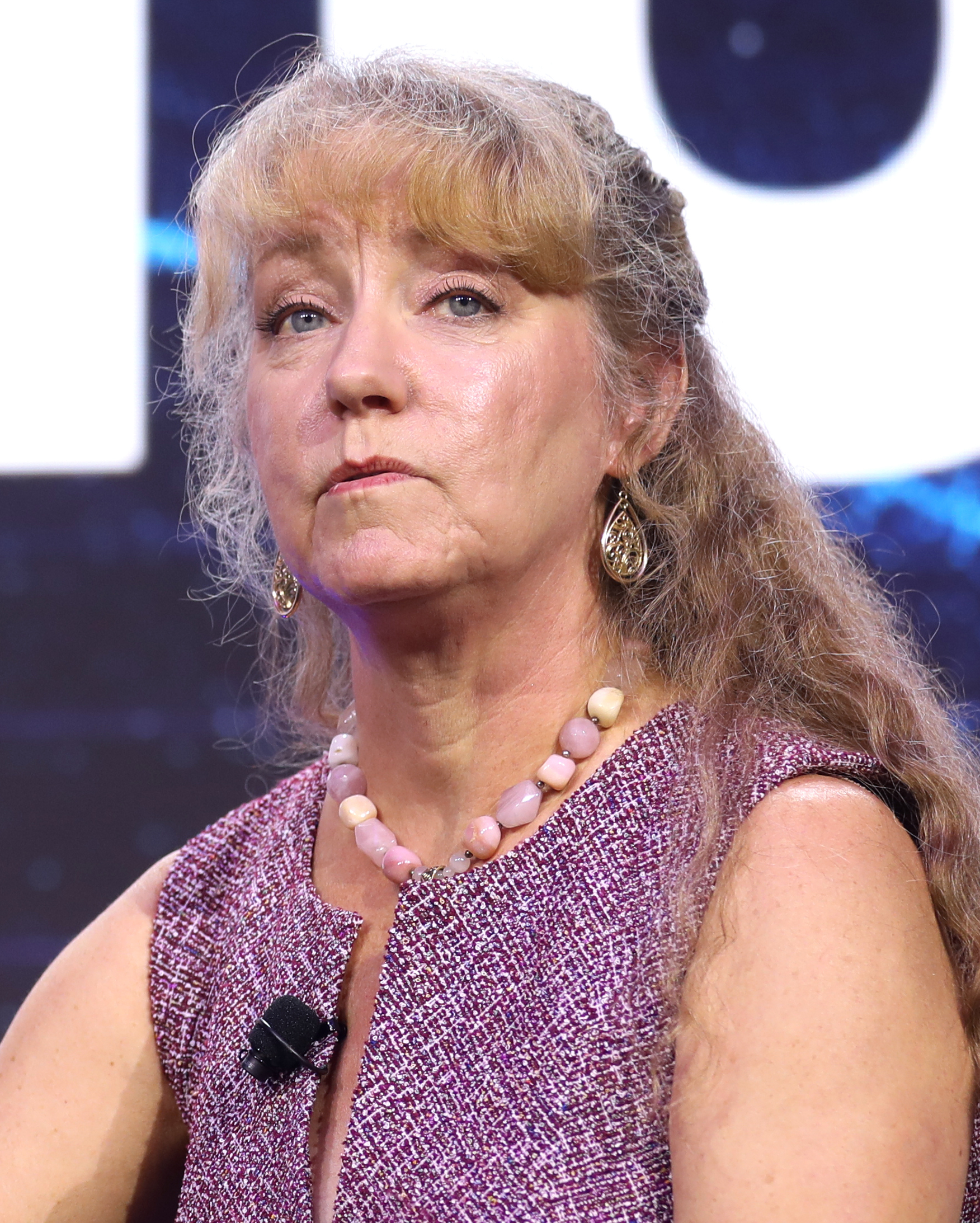

Member of the Louisiana House of Representatives from the 51st district
- Incumbent
- Assumed office January 11, 2016
- Preceded by: Joe Harrison

Personal details
- Born: Beryl Adams; October 14, 1964 (age 61) Terrebonne Parish, Louisiana, U.S.
- Party: Republican
- Spouse: John Amedee
- Children: 3

Beryl Adams Amedée (born October 14, 1964) is an American politician and businesswoman serving as a member of the Louisiana House of Representatives from the 51st district. Elected in November 2015, she assumed office on January 11, 2016. She is the Chairwoman of the Louisiana Freedom Caucus.

== Early life ==
Amedée was born in Terrebonne Parish, Louisiana.

== Career ==
Amedée is the co-owner of Forerunner Errand and Concierge. She is also a pastor at the Vision Christian Center in Bourg, Louisiana and has served as a Terrebonne Parish elections commissioner since 2001.

She was elected to the Louisiana House of Representatives in November 2015 and assumed office on January 11, 2016.

Amedée authored legislation that would prohibit transgender athletes from competing on girls’ sports teams in schools. She also authored a proposal that would require medical providers to give patients a list of information about vaccines before administering them. Additionally, Amedée introduced a bill seeking to apply state obscenity laws to school libraries; however, this bill ultimately died in committee.
