= Diamond Jo Dubuque =

Coordinates: 42.49695°N 90.659444°W

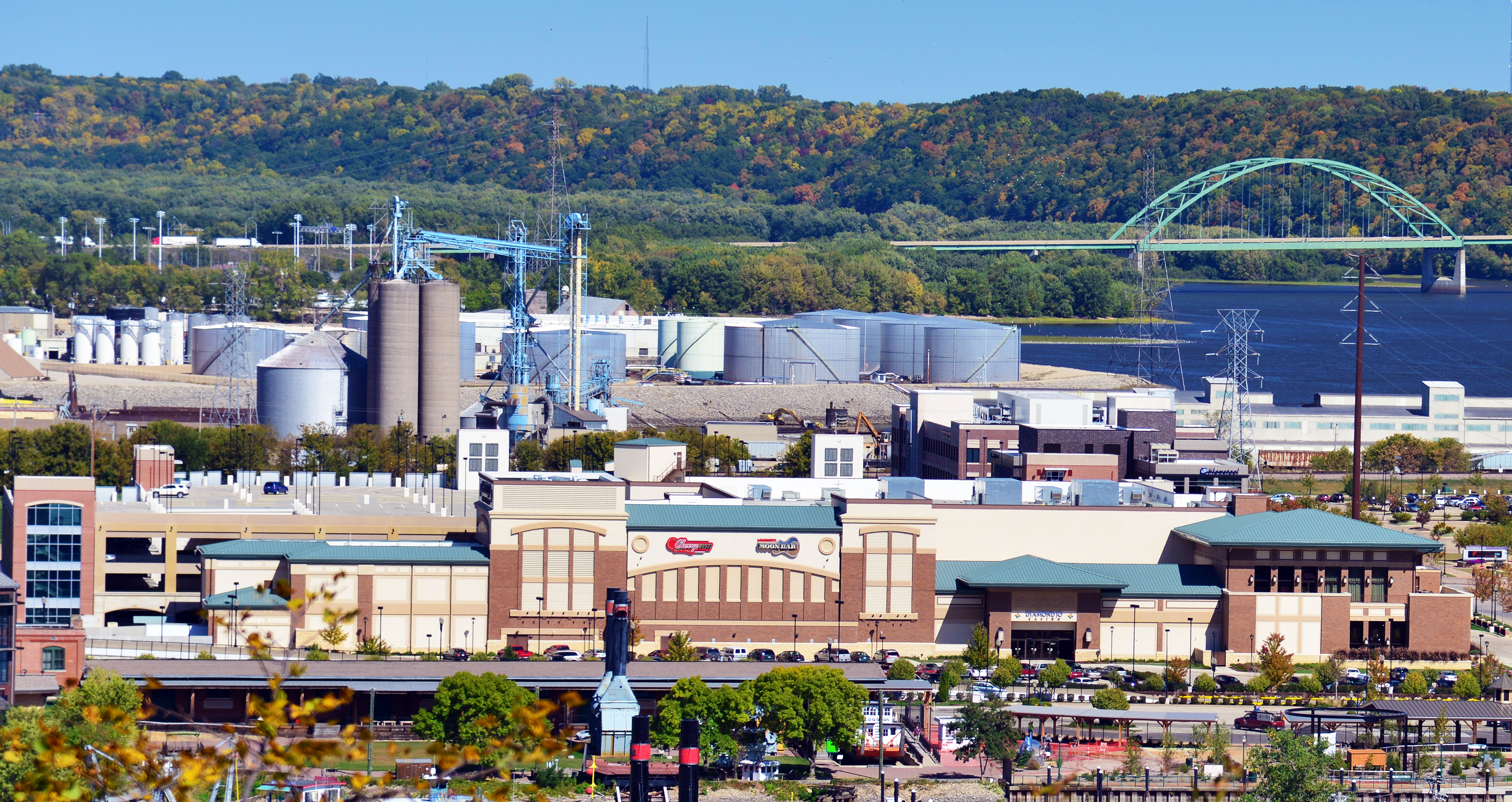
- Diamond Jo in the foreground; the Dubuque-Wisconsin Bridge is at the upper right.

- Location within Iowa
- Interactive map of Diamond Jo Dubuque
- Location: 301 Bell Street Dubuque, Iowa 52001
- Opened: December 11, 2008; 17 years ago
- Theme: Las Vegas
- Gaming space: 35,000 sq ft (3,300 m^{2})
- Casino type: Land
- Owner: Boyd Gaming
- Previous names: Diamond Jo Casino
- Website: diamondjodubuque.boydgaming.com

Diamond Jo Dubuque is a gambling casino and entertainment complex located in the Port of Dubuque, in Dubuque, Iowa. The casino is owned and operated by Las Vegas-based Boyd Gaming, which also owns Diamond Jo Worth in Northwood, Iowa. It is a member of the Iowa Gaming Association, and its license is held by the Dubuque Racing Association, which operates Q Casino. Beginning operations on May 18, 1994, the Diamond Jo was a three-level, 305-foot (93 m), 1,500-passenger vessel in Dubuque's Ice Harbor. The boat was a dockside that did not cruise, the casino became land-based when its new facility opened December 11, 2008.

The facility is located at 301 Bell Street, in the rapidly developing Port of Dubuque. The casino, along with the nearby National Mississippi River Museum & Aquarium and other attractions, have helped to create a large and growing tourism market in Dubuque.

== Riverboat casino ==
As a riverboat operation, the Diamond Jo was the smaller of Dubuque's two casinos, with 19,600 square feet (1,820 m^{2}) of gaming space. It has 777 slot, keno, and video poker games, and 17 table games, including: Big Raise Hold 'em, Blackjack, Craps, Four card poker, Let It Ride, Roulette, Texas Hold 'em, and Three card poker. The operation had three restaurants: the Diamond Deli, HighSteaks Restaurant, and Jo's Café.

== History ==
In 1989, Iowa became the first state to legalize gambling on riverboats. With the law set to take effect on April 1, 1991, the Dubuque Racing Association (DRA), operator of Dubuque Greyhound Park, and Robert Kehl, owner of the local Robert's River Rides excursion boat company, partnered to bring one of the nation's first riverboat casinos to Dubuque. They had the Casino Belle built at Patti Shipyard in Pensacola, Florida, where it was launched on March 24, 1991, forcing the slow-moving ship to race up the Mississippi River to make it to Dubuque for the first day of legal gambling. High water levels and river traffic delayed the ship's passage upriver. The Casino Belle arrived in Dubuque at 12:20 p.m. April 1, more than two hours late for its scheduled maiden voyage. This made it the third and last Iowa riverboat casino to open on that first day, after the Diamond Lady in Bettendorf and the President in Davenport.

In 1993, the Casino Belle left Dubuque to become the Station Casino in St. Charles, Missouri, in anticipation of that state's legalization of riverboat gambling. Soon after, the DRA began to search for a new riverboat to operate under the gaming license already in place. The organization selected the Greater Dubuque Riverboat Entertainment Company L.C., and its boat, which was later named the Diamond Jo, following a local naming contest. The name honors businessman Joseph "Diamond Jo" Reynolds, who owned a Dubuque shipping company, among other enterprises. The "first" Diamond Jo began operations on May 18, 1994. After a year and a half, in October 1995, that boat was replaced with a larger, 1,500-passenger riverboat.

In July 1999, Dubuque-based Peninsula Gaming purchased the casino operation, and spent $1 million updating the riverboat. Peninsula Gaming continues to operate the casino. In 2006, Peninsula opened a second Diamond in Northwood, Iowa, 200 miles (320 km) from Dubuque. Peninsula was acquired in November 2012 by Boyd Gaming.

== Expansion ==
In September 2006, Peninsula Gaming officials announced that the Diamond Jo would begin a major expansion, during which it would become a land-based casino. The $75 million project, scheduled open in November 2008, was planned to include 1,000 slot machines, 17 table games, and a poker room in a new 35,000-square-foot (3,300 m^{2}) casino. Also included in the project were a 36-lane bowling and entertainment center, three restaurants, retail stores, and a 1,130-space, $23 million parking ramp.

The casino's expanded operation is part of the "America's River Project: Phase II", also involving a major expansion of the National Mississippi River Museum & Aquarium. The museum was planned to take over the Diamond Jo's existing Portside Building, as well as the riverboat, and renovate them into an IMAX-like theater and exhibit space.

== Land-based casino complex ==
The land-based complex, which is a short distance away from the old casino property, opened on December 11, 2008. This two-story, $82 million facility has approximately 900 slot and video machines, 17 table games, and a separate high-stakes gaming area. The Diamond Jo complex features three sitdown restaurants (The Woodfire Grille, The Filament and Kitchen Buffet), two bars (the Tree Bar and The Game Sports Bar), a 30-lane bowling alley (Cherry Lanes) with scheduled leagues, and an entertainment theatre complex, The Mississippi Moon Bar. The Mississippi Moon Bar was named after the refrain in the Doobie Brothers song "Black Water", which the casino has used in commercials. The Doobie Brothers were also one of the first groups to perform at the bar.
