= Diamond Joe (cowboy song) =

Cowboy song written in 1944

- Genre: Folk music

"Diamond Joe" is a modern folk song about a ranch owner named Diamond Joe, first written in 1944 by Baldwin "Butch" Hawes for the BBC radio program "The Chisholm Trail", and later recorded by Cisco Houston, Ramblin' Jack Elliott, Bob Dylan, Ian Tyson, James Taylor, Laurie Lewis, and Joe Val.

It is distinct from the African American folk song "Diamond Joe", but was inspired by a separate folk song "Diamond Joe", which was collected from J.D. Dillingham in 1935 and published by John Lomax and Alan Lomax in 1941.

== History ==
In 1935, John Lomax collected a folk song "Diamond Joe" from a conductor on the Houston and Texas Central Railway, in Austin, Texas. The song is about a rich Texas cattleman and was reportedly popular in Central Texas in the 1870s. In 1938, Alan Lomax and John Lomax published it as part of Cowboy Songs and other Frontier Ballads, and then in 1941 as part of in Our Singing Country. In Cowboy Songs, it's attributed to J. D. Dillingham, while in Our Singing Country, it's attributed to J. B. Dillingham. Dillingham was "a skilled banjo player with an articulate knowledge of black banjo styles", and, according to musician and researcher Stephen Wade (musician), his version may have had a shared origin with the African American folk song.

Elizabeth Lomax wrote "The Chisholm Trail", a radio program for the BBC, in 1944, along with her husband, Alan Lomax, who selected the music. It was intended to use the folk song that he had published previously. After the script was finished, the music director Bess Lomax Hawes discovered that the folk song was a slow waltz that was not appropriate for the program, and commissioned her husband Baldwin "Butch" Hawes to write a song for the program based on the folk song. He did so, basing the tune on the folk song "The State of Arkansas" and creating lyrics inspired by the folk song.

Cisco Houston was a member of the cast of "The Chisholm Trail" and later covered the song in 1952, on his LP "Cowboy Ballads" for Folkways Records. Ramblin' Jack Elliott was taught the song at a rodeo in Brussels in 1958 by a cowboy George Williams, who had learned the song from Houston's record.

In 1992, Bob Dylan covered it as part of the album Good As I Been To You. This is distinct from his cover of the African American folk song "Diamond Joe", which he recorded for the soundtrack for the movie Masked and Anonymous in 2003.
