= Diamond Donner =

American stage actor

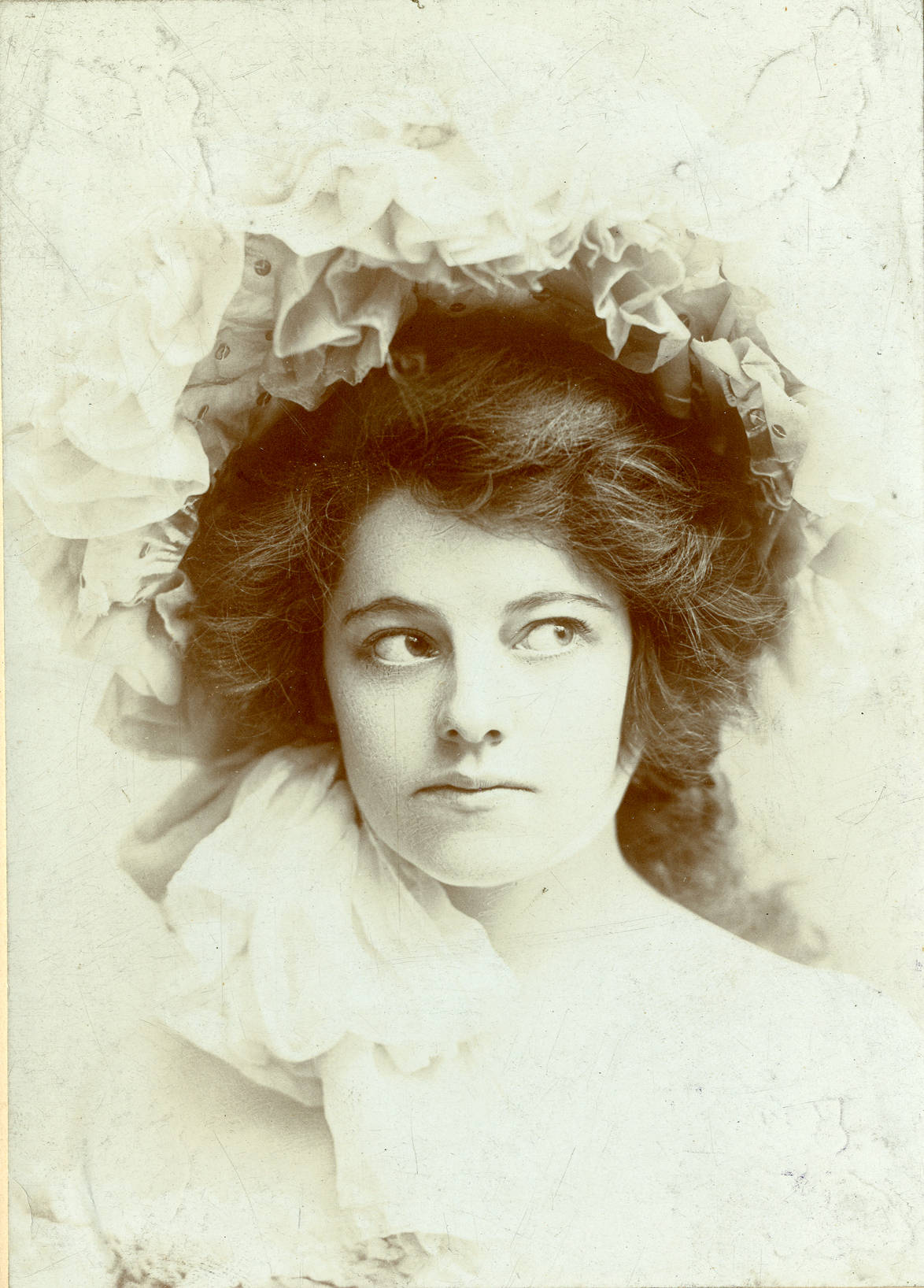
- Donner in 1904
- Education: Wellesley College (1901)
- Occupation: Actor

Diamond Donner was an early 20th-century theatre actor.

== Personal life ==
From Boston, Diamond Donner was the daughter of Gustav Theodore and Louella Donner. She was a 1901 alumnus of Wellesley College. In August 1906, Donner had her mother committed to Ardendale Sanitarium in Cos Cob, Connecticut; when the older woman escaped on September 6 and was not recommitted, Donner traveled to Greenwich, Connecticut on September 10 to request adjudication on the matter.

== Career ==
An aspiring stage actor since childhood, after graduating from Wellesley, she began her acting career as a chorus girl in The Prince of Pilsen. According to The Minneapolis Journal, Donner looked so much like the famous actor Ethel Barrymore, she was frequently called the other woman's name. In 1913, Donner's performance of Mimi in Carmen was described as one of the most significant triumphs of the season by the Daily Sentinel.

Stage performances
Year(s)	Title	Role	Location(s)	Citation(s)
1902–	The Prince of Pilsen	Chorus girl	Boston, the Studebaker Theater in Chicago, and on tour	
1903	The Girl from Dixie		Madison Square Theatre in New York City	
1904	The Man from China	Janet Gramercy	Majestic Theatre in New York City	
1905	Lifting the Lid		New Amsterdam Aerial Theatre and Gardens in New York City	
1906	Humpty Dumpty		New York Theatre in New York City	
1905	The District Leader		Wallack's Theatre in New York City	
1911	The Maestro's Masterpiece		Columbia Theater in Washington, D.C.	
1912–	Carmen	Mimi and Micaela	Boston Opera House	
