= Evangeline Downs =

Casino in Louisiana

Coordinates: 30.526095°N 92.060344°W

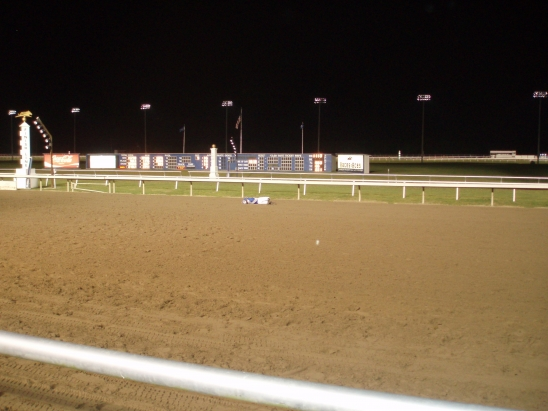
- Track during Lafayette Stakes
- Interactive map of Evangeline Downs
- Gaming space: 48,000 sq ft (4,500 m^{2})
- Casino type: Racino
Evangeline Downs
- Interactive map of Evangeline Downs
- Location: St. Landry Parish, Louisiana
- Owned by: Boyd Gaming
- Date opened: April 28, 1966

Evangeline Downs Racetrack & Casino is a racetrack in St. Landry Parish, Louisiana, just east of Opelousas. It is owned and operated by Boyd Gaming. With a one-mile oval track, the facility provides close to 1,000 horse stalls for Thoroughbred flat racing and American Quarter Horse racing. The original track opened on April 28, 1966 at Carencro, Louisiana and remained there until 2005 when it moved to Opelousas, Louisiana.

== History ==
On April 28, 1966, Evangeline Downs opened for business in its original location along U.S. Highway 167 (also known as the Evangeline Thruway, and today as Interstate Highway 49) at Carencro, Louisiana, just north of the city limits of Lafayette, Louisiana.

In 1982, Rodney Verret, Ted Haik, Sam Rankin, and Joe Jones bought the track for $12.4 million.

In 1985, they sold it to Norman Denny and Larry Willis for $16.5 million. Denny and Willis soon ran into financial problems. After a missed payment of purse money, the Louisiana Racing Commission threatened to shut down the track. Evangeline Downs was forced to file for Chapter 11 bankruptcy protection, and closed indefinitely in October 1986. Unable to negotiate a reorganization, Denny and Willis shifted to Chapter 7 liquidation, asking a court to sell the track.

The Louisiana Savings Association, primary mortgage holder for the property, bought it at auction for the minimum bid of $333,335. Races resumed in April 1987.

Evangeline Downs added video poker machines in 1992. In a 1996 election, Lafayette Parish voters enacted a parish-wide ban on video poker. As a result, the track made plans to move to St. Landry Parish, whose voters had rejected a similar ban.

In February 2002, Peninsula Gaming bought a fifty percent interest in the track from B. I. Moody for $15 million. They bought the remaining half several months later from William Trotter for another $15 million, plus 0.5% of slot revenues for the first ten years. Peninsula carried out the move to Opelousas, opening a casino at the new site in late 2003, with races following in 2005. Peninsula was acquired by Boyd Gaming in November 2012.

In 2009, the Horseplayers Association of North America introduced a rating system for 65 thoroughbred racetracks in North America. Of the top ten, Evangeline Downs was ranked #6.

In 2020, the original site in Carencro was converted into a distribution center for Amazon.

== Sports ==
=== Boxing ===
On November 6, 2014, Regis Prograis fought Jeff Humphries on a boxing card with Prograis winning with a KO in round 1.

=== Notable horse races ===
On September 5, 1977, U.S. Racing Hall of Fame inductee, John Henry won his first-ever stakes race at Evangeline Downs, capturing the Lafayette Futurity.

A number of notable jockeys began their professional careers at this track, including Robby Albarado, Ronald Ardoin, Calvin Borel, Curt Bourque, Eddie Delahoussaye, Kent Desormeaux, Mark Guidry, Randy Romero, Shane Sellers and Ray Sibille.
