= Amelia, Louisiana =

- Census-designated place
- Location of Amelia in Louisiana
- Coordinates: 29°40′24″N 91°06′11″W
- Country: United States
- State: Louisiana
- Parish: St. Mary

Area
  - Total: 2.78 sq mi (7.20 km^{2})
  - Land: 2.52 sq mi (6.53 km^{2})
  - Water: 0.26 sq mi (0.67 km^{2})
- Elevation: 7 ft (2.1 m)

Population (2020)
  - Total: 2,132
  - Density: 845.8/sq mi (326.56/km^{2})
- Time zone: UTC-6 (CST)
  - Summer (DST): UTC-5 (CDT)
- Area code: 985
- FIPS code: 22-01815

Amelia is a census-designated place (CDP) in St. Mary Parish, Louisiana, United States. As of the 2020 census, Amelia had a population of 2,132. It is part of the Morgan City Micropolitan Statistical Area.

== History ==
The first postmaster named the town after Amelia Dupuis, his fiancée, who died shortly before their wedding day.

== Geography ==
Amelia is located at 29°40′24″N 91°6′11″W (29.673361, -91.103181).

On the eastern side of Amelia over Bayou Boeuf is the Assumption Parish line and the unincorporated community of Boeuf, Louisiana. Morgan City is located 8 miles (13 km) to the west.

According to the United States Census Bureau, the CDP has a total area of 2.8 square miles (7.3 km^{2}), of which 2.6 square miles (6.7 km^{2}) is land and 0.27 square miles (0.7 km^{2}), or 9.12%, is water.

== Demographics ==
Historical population
Census	Pop.	Note	%±
1970	2,292		—
1980	3,617		57.8%
1990	2,447		−32.3%
2000	2,423		−1.0%
2010	2,459		1.5%
2020	2,132		−13.3%
U.S. Decennial Census; 1950 1960 1970 1980; 1990 2000 2010

Amelia first appeared as an unincorporated place in the 1970 U.S. census; and as a census designated place the 1980 U.S. Census.

Amelia racial composition as of 2020
Race	Number	Percentage
White (non-Hispanic)	583	27.35%
Black or African American (non-Hispanic)	172	8.07%
Native American	16	0.75%
Asian	253	11.87%
Other/Mixed	60	2.81%
Hispanic or Latino	1,048	49.16%

As of the 2020 United States census, there were 2,132 people, 904 households, and 522 families residing in the CDP.
