= Joe Harrison (politician) =

Member of Louisiana State Legislature

Member of the Louisiana House of Representatives from the 51st district
- In office January 2008 – January 11, 2016
- Preceded by: Carla Blanchard Dartez
- Succeeded by: Beryl Amedee

Personal details
- Born: Joseph Arthur Harrison; February 15, 1952 (age 74)
- Party: Republican
- Spouse: Susan Boudreaux Harrison
- Education: Nicholls State University

Joseph Arthur Harrison, known as Joe Harrison (born February 15, 1952), is an American politician and financial planner who served as a member of the Louisiana House of Representatives for the 51st district from 2008 to 2016. He formerly served on the board of the American Legislative Exchange Council (ALEC), a conservative group of state legislators and private businesspersons.

== Career ==
Harrison was elected to the Louisiana House of Representatives in 2007 and assumed office in January 2008.

On November 2, Speaker Chuck Kleckley of Lake Charles removed Harrison and a conservative colleague, Cameron Henry of Jefferson Parish, from the House Appropriations Committee after the two had challenged Governor Jindal regarding state expenditures, including the use of one-time funds in the budget and the privatization of the Louisiana Office of Group Benefits in Baton Rouge, which had been established through the efforts of the late state budget director Ralph Perlman. Harrison was particularly critical of Speaker Kleckley for his failure to defend lawmakers in conflict with the governor. Cameron was formerly vice chairman of the committee.

Harrison lost his runoff election on November 21, 2015. In the October 24 primary, he obtained 3,070 votes (36.7 percent). The leading candidate, Beryl Amedee, another Republican, finished with 3,391 votes (40.6 percent). The remaining 1,899 votes (22.7 percent) went to the Democrat Howard J. Castay, Jr. In the second election, Amedee prevailed, 4,101 votes (52 percent) to 3,783 (48 percent).

Louisiana House of Representatives
Preceded by Carla Blanchard Dartez	Louisiana State Representative for District 51 (Assumption, Lafourche, St. Mary, and Terrebonne parishes); 2008–2016	Succeeded by Beryl Amedee
