= Four Card Poker =

Casino card game similar to Three Card Poker

Four Card Poker is a casino card game similar to Three Card Poker, invented by Roger Snow and owned by Shuffle Master.

== Description of play ==
The player can place an ante bet or an "Aces Up" bet or both. Five playing cards are dealt to the player, while the dealer is dealt five cards face down and a sixth card face up. Both the player and the dealer make their best four-card hands. The dealer's advantages are in having an extra card and the fact that if the player folds, he will lose his ante, even if his hand turns out to be better than the dealer's.

After seeing their cards and the dealer's face up card, the player can opt to fold the ante bet, in which case the player loses it, or play by betting 1-3 times their ante. Unlike Three Card Poker and some other games, the dealer always qualifies (plays). If the player ties or beats the dealer, the player is paid the amount bet. A bonus is paid if the player has a three of a kind (2-1 for the original ante bet only), straight flush (20-1), or four of a kind (25-1). This bonus is paid out even if the dealer's hand is better than the player's; however, in this situation, the player would still lose their ante and play bets.

The Aces Up bet depends solely on the player's hand. If the player has a pair of aces or better, they win, otherwise they lose. The dealer's hand is immaterial. The payout for a win can range from 1-1 for a pair of aces to 50-1 for four of a kind, the best possible hand. Various payout variations are possible, depending on the casino, resulting in a house edge ranging from 1.98% to 6.15%.

== Rank of hands ==
The possible four-card hands are (from best to worst):

- Four of a kind
- Straight flush
- Three of a kind
- Flush
- Straight
- Two pair
- One pair
- High card
