= Diamond Jo Worth =

- Interactive map of Diamond Jo Worth
- Location: 777 Diamond Jo Ln. Northwood, Iowa 50459; 43.446781°N 93.354542°W
- Opened: April 6, 2006
- Gaming space: 38,700 sq ft (3,600 m^{2})
- Signature attractions: Event Center; Pheasant Links
- Notable restaurants: Woodfire Grille
- Casino type: Land based
- Owner: Boyd Gaming
- Previous names: Diamond Jo Casino–Worth
- Website: diamondjoworth.boydgaming.com

Diamond Jo Worth is a casino and entertainment complex in Worth County, Iowa, near Northwood. The casino is owned and operated by Boyd Gaming, which also owns Diamond Jo Dubuque in Dubuque, Iowa. It is a member of the Iowa Gaming Association, and its license is held by the Worth County Development Authority. The property opened on April 6, 2006, with a grand opening celebration on April 18, 2006. A hotel is also available across the street.

== Gaming ==
The Diamond Jo offers 793 slot machines, including traditional slot machines, video slots, video poker and keno. There are a total of 22 table games, plus a FanDuel sports book area.

== Attractions ==
- The Event Center
- The Woodfire Grille
- Subway
- 35 Brew Street Bar and Grill

== Pheasant Links ==
Organizers envisioned an outdoor haven where a select number of sports enthusiasts could hunt for waterfowl and upland birds, shoot sporting clays and play golf on a challenging course—all in one location. After careful consideration, 440 acres (180 ha) of pristine, natural woodlands in southern Minnesota were selected. Abundant with verdant marshlands and lush landscapes, this site is also home to a private lodge.

Soon after opening its doors in 2006, Diamond Jo purchased Arrowhead Golf Course located just outside Emmons, Minnesota. Once purchased, organizers spent time renovating everything from facilities to fairways, reopening the course as Pheasant Links Golf and Hunting Preserve. Pheasant Links consists of a nine-hole Scottish links-style course offering multiple tee boxes per hole.

Along with golf, Pheasant Links offers sporting clays stations located throughout the golf course. Pheasant Links is also a private hunting preserve with over 400 acres (160 ha) of huntable land with game including pheasant, quail, and chukar. Deer hunting is also offered.

Pheasant Links is offered as a perk only for eligible regular casino customers.
