= Morgan City, Louisiana =

- City
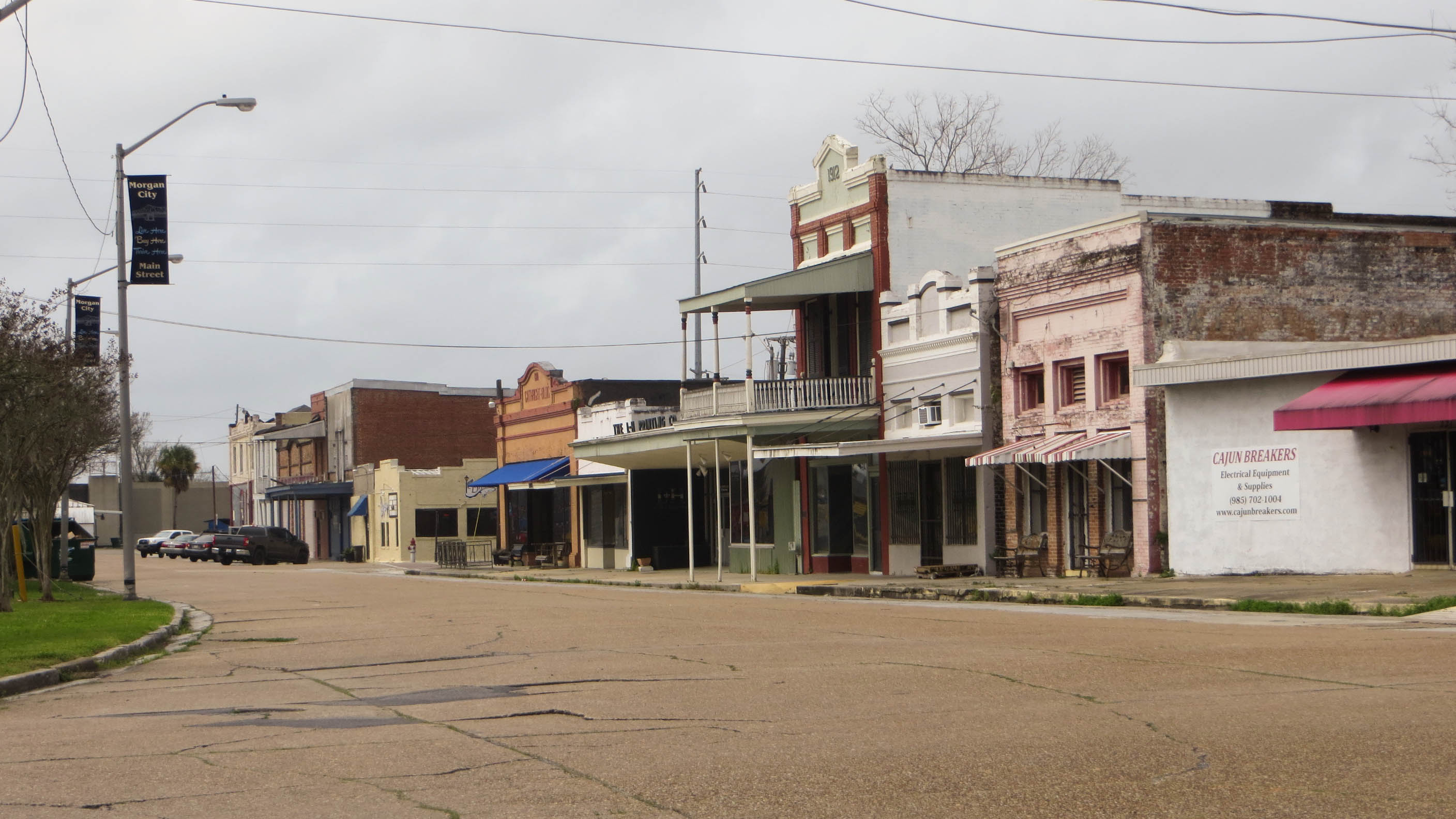
- Motto: Right in the Middle of Everywhere
- Location of Morgan City in St. Mary Parish, Louisiana.

- Location of Louisiana in the United States
- Coordinates: 29°42′03″N 91°11′50″W
- Country: United States
- State: Louisiana
- Parish: St. Mary, St. Martin

Government
  - Mayor: Lee Dragna

Area
  - Total: 6.25 sq mi (16.19 km^{2})
  - Land: 5.98 sq mi (15.50 km^{2})
  - Water: 0.27 sq mi (0.69 km^{2})
- Elevation: 7 ft (2.1 m)

Population (2020)
  - Total: 11,472
  - Density: 1,917.1/sq mi (740.19/km^{2})
- Time zone: UTC-6 (CST)
  - Summer (DST): UTC-5 (CDT)
- ZIP code: 70380
- Area code: 985
- FIPS code: 22-52040
- Website: www.cityofmc.com

Morgan City is a city in St. Mary Parish, Louisiana, United States, located in the Acadiana region. The population was 10,813 in the 2024 census.

Morgan City sits on the banks of the Atchafalaya River near its intersection with the Intracoastal Waterway. The town was originally named "Tiger Island" by surveyors appointed by U.S. Secretary of War John Calhoun, because of a particular type of wild cat seen in the area. It was later changed for a time to "Brashear City", named after Walter Brashear, a prominent Kentucky physician who had purchased large tracts of land and acquired numerous sugar mills in the area. It was incorporated in 1860.

Morgan City, and all of St. Mary Parish, is included in the Lafayette-Opelousas-Morgan City CSA.

== History ==
=== Capture of Brashear City ===
During the American Civil War, the Star Fort of Fort Brashear was the larger of two works erected by the Union Army occupying the city to defend a Federal military depot and the town. During the Bayou Teche Campaign, on the night of June 22, 1863, 325 Confederates of Gen. A. A. Mouton's command, led by Major Sherod Hunter, landed their skiffs and flats in the rear of the town. Attacking the next day, they surprised and captured the city, taking 1,300 Union prisoners, 11 heavy siege guns, 2,500 stands of rifles, immense quantities of quartermaster, commissary and ordnance stores. They also captured 2,000 African Americans, between 200 and 300 wagons and tents, all while suffering losses of only three killed, 18 wounded.

=== Morgan City ===
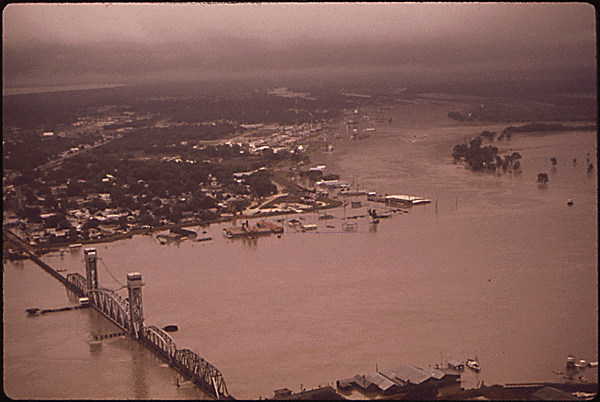
Flooding in May 1973

In 1876, the community's name was changed to Morgan City in tribute to Charles Morgan, a rail and steamship magnate who first dredged the Atchafalaya Bay Ship Channel to accommodate ocean-going vessels.

On September 11, 1961, an F2 tornado struck the city, causing heavy damage to the city and injuring 16 people.

In middle April 1973, the city had 14 inch rainfall over 48 hours along with flooding in the Mississippi River and Atchafalaya River systems, but the Army provided an engineering battalion to shore up emergency works to protect the city.

On October 28, 1985, Hurricane Juan (not to be confused with the 2003 storm of the same name) made landfall near Morgan City, flooding many parts of the city. The storm then looped offshore and came onshore again in Alabama.

On August 26, 1992, Hurricane Andrew came ashore 20 miles (32 km) to the southwest of Morgan City. Andrew was the second most destructive hurricane in U.S. history, crossing Florida and then regaining strength in the Gulf of Mexico before it struck Louisiana.

In 2019, Morgan City and the surrounding area were selected as a setting for the paranormal-themed reality TV show Ghosts of Morgan City, broadcast on the Travel Channel. On July 13, 2019 Hurricane Barry made landfall west of Morgan City as a Category 1 Hurricane on the Saffir–Simpson scale.

=== Agricultural ===
A type of blackberry deemed the youngberry was developed by B.M. Young in 1905 in Morgan City, as a hybrid between a variety of blackberries. The youngberry is a cross between Luther Burbank's Phenomenal Berry and the Austin-Mayes dewberry, a trailing blackberry. The youngberry was introduced commercially in 1926 and quickly came to rival the loganberry. The youngberry had excellent qualities, such as taste and high yields and it soon replaced the loganberry of California.

== Geography ==
According to the United States Census Bureau, the city has a total area of 6.2 square miles (16.1 km^{2}), of which 6.0 square miles (15.5 km^{2}) is land and 0.27 square miles (0.7 km^{2}), or 4.03%, is water.

The northeastern border of Morgan City is at the lower St. Martin Parish line via Louisiana Highway 70.

U.S. Highway 90 (future Interstate 49) and Louisiana Highway 182 both pass through the city, both heading west 70 miles (110 km) to Lafayette. U.S. 90 also heads east approximately 90 miles (140 km) to New Orleans, while passing in between the cities of Houma, which is located approximately 40 miles (64 km) southeast, and Thibodaux, which is located 32 miles (51 km) northeast of Morgan City. U.S. 90 is a freeway between Morgan City and the Houma area with the route planned to become a section of future Interstate 49.

Morgan City is served by the Harry P. Williams Memorial Airport, a general aviation airfield located near the U.S. 90 four lane highway in nearby Patterson, Louisiana.

If the Mississippi River were to experience a major course change in the vicinity of the Old River Control Structure or Morganza Spillway, the main channel of the river would likely then enter the Gulf of Mexico near Morgan City instead of New Orleans.

=== Climate ===
Morgan City has a humid subtropical climate (Köppen: Cfa) with long, hot summers and short, mild winters.

Climate data for Morgan City, Louisiana (1991–2020 normals, extremes 1922–2021)
Month	Jan	Feb	Mar	Apr	May	Jun	Jul	Aug	Sep	Oct	Nov	Dec	Year
Record high °F (°C)	84 (29)	86 (30)	90 (32)	92 (33)	96 (36)	101 (38)	102 (39)	101 (38)	99 (37)	97 (36)	91 (33)	86 (30)	102 (39)
Mean maximum °F (°C)	75.7 (24.3)	77.2 (25.1)	79.9 (26.6)	83.8 (28.8)	89.3 (31.8)	93.1 (33.9)	94.7 (34.8)	94.7 (34.8)	92.9 (33.8)	88.5 (31.4)	82.0 (27.8)	77.0 (25.0)	96.2 (35.7)
Mean daily maximum °F (°C)	63.0 (17.2)	66.5 (19.2)	71.8 (22.1)	78.0 (25.6)	84.1 (28.9)	88.9 (31.6)	90.5 (32.5)	90.4 (32.4)	87.9 (31.1)	81.1 (27.3)	72.0 (22.2)	65.6 (18.7)	78.3 (25.7)
Daily mean °F (°C)	54.2 (12.3)	57.7 (14.3)	63.2 (17.3)	69.5 (20.8)	76.4 (24.7)	81.7 (27.6)	83.4 (28.6)	83.3 (28.5)	80.5 (26.9)	72.4 (22.4)	62.5 (16.9)	56.6 (13.7)	70.1 (21.2)
Mean daily minimum °F (°C)	45.4 (7.4)	48.9 (9.4)	54.6 (12.6)	61.0 (16.1)	68.7 (20.4)	74.6 (23.7)	76.3 (24.6)	76.2 (24.6)	73.0 (22.8)	63.7 (17.6)	53.0 (11.7)	47.7 (8.7)	61.9 (16.6)
Mean minimum °F (°C)	29.7 (−1.3)	34.1 (1.2)	38.8 (3.8)	47.2 (8.4)	57.3 (14.1)	67.5 (19.7)	70.9 (21.6)	69.8 (21.0)	63.0 (17.2)	47.7 (8.7)	38.2 (3.4)	33.2 (0.7)	27.5 (−2.5)
Record low °F (°C)	12 (−11)	17 (−8)	17 (−8)	35 (2)	42 (6)	55 (13)	60 (16)	56 (13)	46 (8)	35 (2)	22 (−6)	10 (−12)	10 (−12)
Average precipitation inches (mm)	4.99 (127)	3.27 (83)	3.86 (98)	4.02 (102)	4.55 (116)	7.02 (178)	6.23 (158)	7.27 (185)	5.40 (137)	4.03 (102)	3.91 (99)	3.96 (101)	58.51 (1,486)
Average precipitation days (≥ 0.01 in)	10.0	8.2	7.4	7.0	7.1	11.5	14.2	14.8	10.8	6.8	7.0	8.2	113.0
Source: NOAA

== Demographics ==
Historical population
Census	Pop.	Note	%±
1880	2,015		—
1890	2,291		13.7%
1900	2,332		1.8%
1910	5,477		134.9%
1920	5,429		−0.9%
1930	5,985		10.2%
1940	6,969		16.4%
1950	9,759		40.0%
1960	13,540		38.7%
1970	16,586		22.5%
1980	16,114		−2.8%
1990	14,531		−9.8%
2000	12,703		−12.6%
2010	12,404		−2.4%
2020	11,472		−7.5%
2025 (est.)	10,757	▼	−6.2%
U.S. Decennial Census

=== Racial and ethnic composition ===
Morgan City city, Louisiana – Racial and ethnic composition Note: the US Census treats Hispanic/Latino as an ethnic category. This table excludes Latinos from the racial categories and assigns them to a separate category. Hispanics/Latinos may be of any race.
Race / Ethnicity (NH = Non-Hispanic)	Pop 2000	Pop 2010	Pop 2020	% 2000	% 2010	% 2020
White alone (NH)	8,814	7,996	6,640	69.39%	64.46%	57.88%
Black or African American alone (NH)	3,027	2,888	2,510	23.83%	23.28%	21.88%
Native American or Alaska Native alone (NH)	109	139	104	0.86%	1.12%	0.91%
Asian alone (NH)	127	223	187	1.00%	1.80%	1.63%
Native Hawaiian or Pacific Islander alone (NH)	1	2	1	0.01%	0.02%	0.01%
Other race alone (NH)	9	19	28	0.07%	0.15%	0.24%
Mixed race or Multiracial (NH)	188	171	452	1.48%	1.38%	3.94%
Hispanic or Latino (any race)	428	966	1,550	3.37%	7.79%	13.51%
Total	12,703	12,404	11,472	100.00%	100.00%	100.00%

=== 2020 census ===
As of the 2020 United States census, there were 11,472 people, 4,732 households, and 2,492 families residing in the city. As of the census of 2000, there were 12,703 people, 5,037 households, and 3,394 families residing in the city. The population density was 2,166.5 inhabitants per square mile (836.5/km^{2}). There were 5,627 housing units at an average density of 959.7 per square mile (370.5/km^{2}).

In 2000, the racial makeup of the city was 71.28% White, 23.90% African American, 0.91% American Indian, 1.02% Asian, 0.01% Pacific Islander, 1.18% from other races, and 1.69% from two or more races. Hispanic of any race were 3.37% of the population. By 2020, its racial and ethnic makeup was 57.88% non-Hispanic white, 21.88% African American, 0.91% Native American, 1.63% Asian, 0.01% Pacific Islander, 4.18% other or multiracial, and 13.51% Hispanic or Latino of any race.

In 2000, there were 5,037 households, out of which 31.2% had children under the age of 18 living with them, 47.0% were married couples living together, 15.8% had a female householder with no husband present, and 32.6% were non-families. 28.0% of all households were made up of individuals, and 10.8% had someone living alone who was 65 years of age or older. The average household size was 2.48 and the average family size was 3.04.

In the city, the population was spread out, with 26.4% under the age of 18, 8.7% from 18 to 24, 27.7% from 25 to 44, 23.3% from 45 to 64, and 13.9% who were 65 years of age or older. The median age was 36 years. For every 100 females, there were 93.0 males. For every 100 females age 18 and over, there were 91.8 males.

The median income for a household in the city was $28,324, and the median income for a family was $36,196. Males had a median income of $31,712 versus $19,550 for females. The per capita income for the city was $14,577. About 17.7% of families and 20.7% of the population were below the poverty line, including 27.3% of those under age 18 and 17.7% of those age 65 or over.

== Education ==
St. Mary Parish School Board operates public schools:

- Morgan City High School
- Morgan City Junior High School

Elementary schools:

- J. B. Maitland Elementary School
- M. E. Norman Elementary School
- M. D. Shannon Elementary School
- Wyandotte Elementary School

There is a private Catholic Pre-k through grade 12 school, Central Catholic High School.

== Louisiana Shrimp and Petroleum Festival ==
The town hosts the Louisiana Shrimp and Petroleum Festival each year. Sponsors of the festival have included Shell.

== Notable people ==
- Bill Burgo (1919–1988), baseball player
- Carla Blanchard Dartez, former state representative
- Mo B. Dick (Born Raymond E Poole, 1965), music producer
- Eddie Dyer (1899–1964), Major League Baseball player, St. Louis Cardinals pitcher
- Sid Gautreaux (1912–1980), baseball player
- Anthony Guarisco, Jr. (born 1938), state senator from 1976 to 1988; lawyer and real estate businessman, now in Baton Rouge
- Mark Hall (born 1965), football player
- René Hall (1912–1988), session guitarist
- Burt Lancon, figure skater in the 1984 Winter Olympics
- Geronimo Pratt (1947–2011), Black Panther
- Sam Seamans (born 1967), Reformed Episcopal Church Bishop, former Southern Baptist
