= List of mayors of Sioux City, Iowa =

Sioux City mayoral elections take place on the year preceding the U.S. presidential election. Inauguration typically takes place on the following January 1.

In total, there have been 64 mayors of Sioux City. However, only two of these have been popularly elected, the first being Mike Hobart in 2008.

== List ==
1. John Blair Smith Todd (1857–1857)† after winning the election by a technicality, Todd refused to serve naming Colonel Robert Means acting mayor until 1858.
2. Robert Means (1857–1859)† Sioux City's first acting mayor.
3. William Bigelow (1859–1860)† first secretary of Woodbury County's agricultural board.
4. George W. Chamberlain (1860–1861)† served as Woodbury's first county surveyor and third county sheriff.
5. John K. Cook (1861–1863)† founded Sioux City in 1854. First person to serve two terms.
6. William R. Smith (1863–1864)† Member of the Iowa's Cavalry against the Native Americans and historian for Sioux City. First mayor to serve two nonconsecutive terms.
7. Charles Kent (1864–1865)†
8. J.L. Follett (1865–1866)† as the brother of a New York judge, and a long time lumber merchant, Follett was elected for his practical knowledge.
9. George Weare (1866–1867)† commonly called Iowa's First Banker, he was the co–founder of Weare and Allison Bank before it merged with Iowa State National Bank.
10. C.K. Smith (1867–1868)† was a member of Sioux City's first council.
11. F.M. Ziebach (1968–1970)†
12. Daniel Hedges (1870–1871)† With his brother and John Pierce built the north side of Sioux City.
13. S.T. Davis (1871–1872)†
14. G.W. Kingsworth (1872–1873)† he served as Woodbury's Agricultural Society President.
15. R.F. Turner (1873–1874)†
16. H.L. Warner (1874–1876)†
17. S.B. Jackson (1876–1880)†
18. C.F. Hoyt (1880–1881)† as a businessman, he owned Sioux City Vinegar Works before converting it into a hotel.
19. William R. Smith (1881–1882)†
20. W.Z. Swartz (1882–1885)†
21. D.A. McGee (1885–1886)† in 1877, he served as the King of Sioux City's lodge of the Grand Chapter of The State of Iowa.
22. Jonas M. Cleland (1886–1890)† served two nonconsecutive terms.
23. E.C. Palmer (1890–1892)† He was one of the founders of Palmer Candy Company, the oldest candy store in Sioux City.
24. Maris Peirce (1892–1894)†
25. C.W. Fletcher (1894–1896)†
26. J.M. Cleland (1896–1898)† he died in Chicago, Illinois, in 1913, but his body was brought to Sioux City for his funeral.
27. John Herbert Quick (1898–1900)† as a lawyer and businessman, Quick wrote 18 novels, one of which became the basis of the movie Double Trouble (1915 film).
28. A.H. Burton (1900–1902)† he placed the time capsule into the bricks of the Sergeant Floyd Monument.
29. Ernest W. Caldwell (1902–1904)†
30. W.G. Sears (1904–1910)† At the time, he was the longest–serving mayor in Sioux City history.
31. A.A. Smith (1910–1915)†
32. R.J. Andrews (1917–1918)† ran for reelection in 1918, but was defeated by ~1,000 votes from Wallace Short.
33. Wallace M. Short (1918–1924)† Right before his election, he wrote Let There be Light: A Study in Freedom and Faith, Being a Review of Six Years Ministry in Sioux City, Iowa
34. Stewart Gilman (1924–1928)† first native of Sioux City to become mayor.
35. Thomas Barnett Huff (1929-1930)
36. W.D. Hayes (1930–1938)† Only 20 years after Sears, Hayes beat his longevity by 2 years. He ran against John W. Gwynne in 1938 for Representative of Iowa's third district.
37. David F. Loepp (1939–1943)†
38. Forrest M. Olson (1947–1949)†
39. Dan J. Conley (1950–1952)† Although he won the election of 1952, he faced legal trouble leading him to resign and appointing Ralph Henderson to fulfill his term.
40. Ralph Henderson (1952–1953)†
41. George W. Young (1954–1957)† Served two sets of two, two year terms after serving on the city council for 12 years. Second known person to serve two nonconsecutive mayoral terms in Sioux City.
42. Loren Callendar (1957–1958)† was a controversial mayor because he was elected by the council during a time when Sioux City voted to elect mayors directly. However, the city voted to keep the same, and Loren fulfilled his term.
43. William "Wally" Wilson (1958–1959)†
44. George W. Young (1960–1963)†
45. Stanley L. Greigg (1964–1964)† He is the youngest Sioux City Mayor at the age of 33.
46. Donald Mullin (1966–1968)†
47. Earle Grueskin (1968–1970)† He served on the city council of Sioux City from 1964 to 1971, two of those years were as mayor.
48. Paul A. Berger (1970–1974)† He served as a councilman for two years before being elected mayor in 1970.
49. George A. Cole (1974–1976)† he spent two of his seven years on Sioux City's council serving as mayor. Cole is best known for his implementation of Sioux City's downtown skywalks.
50. George W. Gross (1976–1977)† After serving on the city council for a year, Gross was elected as an Iowa State Senator before returning to the council in 1974 and being appointed mayor two years later.
51. Donald Lawrenson (1978–1980)† very active in local churches, Lawrenson served on the city council for four years and on the Woodbury Board of Supervisors for 12 years.
52. Jim Wharton (1980–1981) Since 1976, he has worked at KMNS radio station. He and his wife also won the Deming Award in 2017.
53. William F. Skinner II (1981–1982)†
54. Kenneth Lawson (1982–1983)† after holding many jobs in Sioux City, Lawson was elected to the city's council and was immediately appointed mayor. He was the first councilman to be appointed mayor during his first year.
55. John W. Van Dyke, Jr. (1984–1986)† After serving as the first chairman of Iowa's Lottery Commission, he had founded the Dakota Water System before being sentenced to 21 months in prison for bank fraud.
56. Cornelius "Conny" Bodine Jr. (January 1987 - May 1987)
57. Loren Callendar (1987–1990)†
58. Robert "Bob" Scott (1990–1998)
59. Tom Padgett (1998–2000)
60. Marty Dougherty (2000–2002) nicknamed "Mr. Transportation" due to his championing of infrastructure and road projects, Dougherty served 12 years on Sioux City's council. In 2006, after Dougherty no longer served on the city council, he was controversially hired by the city manager to become economic director. This was controversial because two of the five councilmen believed that he was inexperienced and is should not get a salary of $79,500. Dougherty still serves as Economic Director as of 2021.
61. Craig Berenstein (2002–2004)
62. Dave Ferris (2004–2005) Ferris resigns one year into his two year term in order to allow Karen Van de Steeg to serve 1 year as mayor.
63. Karen Van de Steeg (2005–2006) Sioux City's first female mayor.
64. Craig Berenstein (2006–2008) one of the few mayors to serve two nonconsecutive terms. Last non–elected mayor to serve prior to the change in the form of government which, in part, requires the mayor to be directly elected by the citizens to a 4-year term.
65. Mike Hobart (2008–2012) First public elected mayor. Prior to this, the council simply appointed one member of the council to serve a 2-year stint as the mayor.
66. Bob Scott (2012–2024) Sitting mayor, the longest-serving Sioux City mayor, and served two nonconsecutive mayoral terms. As of November 2019, Scott has been elected to serve 7 terms, 4 two–year and 3 four–year, or 20 years as the city's highest elected official.
