= KLEM =

- Le Mars, Iowa; United States
- Broadcast area: Sioux City, Iowa
- Frequency: 1410 kHz
- Branding: KLEM 1410 AM 96.9 FM

Programming
- Format: Classic hits

Ownership
- Owner: Powell Broadcasting Company, L.L.C.
- Sister stations: KSUX, KKYY, KQNU, KKMA, KSCJ

History
- First air date: September 21, 1954
- Call sign meaning: Le Mars

Technical information
- Licensing authority: FCC
- Facility ID: 32998
- Class: B
- Power: 1,000 watts (day); 50 watts (night)
- Transmitter coordinates: 42°49′04″N 96°09′47″W
- Translator: 96.9 K245AM (Le Mars)

Links
- Public license information: Public file; LMS
- Webcast: Listen live
- Website: klem1410.com

KLEM (1410 AM) is a radio station licensed to serve Le Mars, Iowa. The station is owned by Powell Broadcasting Company, L.L.C. It airs a classic hits music format.

== History ==
KLEM was established by Bob McKune and officially signed on the air on October 12, 1954. The station was built to serve as the primary local voice for Plymouth County, focusing on "live and local" programming that included high school athletics and agricultural news. In July 1961, the station was sold to Paul and Patty Olson, who operated it for nearly four decades. Ownership transferred to the Powell Broadcasting Company in 1999, which integrated KLEM into a regional cluster of stations serving the Siouxland area.

The KLEM transmitter site is located near the Floyd River, making the station's physical infrastructure highly susceptible to seasonal flooding. Historical river crests have repeatedly compromised the station's AM signal. In September 2018, the Floyd River crested at 25 feet, surrounding the transmitter tower and forcing the station to cut power to the AM equipment to avoid catastrophic electrical failure. In June 2024, the region experienced a "500-year" flood event where the Floyd River reached a record stage of 29 feet at Le Mars. The flooding submerged the transmitter site, leading to a prolonged outage of the 1410 AM signal. During the recovery period, KLEM filed for Special Temporary Authority (STA) with the FCC to operate at a reduced power while the water-damaged components were replaced.
