= Harriett Rinaldo =

- Rinaldo, from the 1928 yearbook of Smith College
- Born: 1906; Sioux City, Iowa, U.S.
- Died: 1981 (aged 74–75)
- Education: Smith College, bachelors with honors (1927), Master's Degree in Social Work (1929)
- Occupations: Social and political activist, community organizer

Harriett Rinaldo (1906 – 1981) was an American social worker known for creating personnel standards, rating procedures and recruitment procedures for the Veterans Administration Social Work Service. The standards and procedures she created became a model for the federal government and other social work agencies. She was the first to identify the term "clinical social work" as a specialty standard with its own personnel specifications.

== Early life and education ==
Rinaldo was born in Sioux City, Iowa in 1906 (some sources give 1907), and lived in Wheaton, Illinois until she began attending Smith College in 1923. Rinaldo graduated with honors in 1927. She continued at Smith and received a master's degree in Social Science in 1929. Her thesis was titled "The altering of family attitudes toward the child with prolonged illness as a causative factor of behavior problems: a study of fifty cases selected at the Institute for Child Guidance, New York City, from Child Guidance Clinic Records to weigh the importance as factors influencing behavior problems of prolonged illness on a child as compared to the effect of the illness in altering parental and siblings attitudes."

== Career ==
After earning a social work degree she worked for the Children's Aid Society in Philadelphia. She later transferred to the county welfare agency in Philadelphia. In 1943 she moved to New York to work for the Social Security Agency. In 1946 she moved to Washington, D.C., to join the Veterans Administration (VA) where she worked until her retirement in 1972.

At the Veterans Administration, Renaldo recruited hundreds of social workers to support the post-World War II VA Medical Services expansion. In this position she established job standards and definitions which later influenced Civil Service requirements for other federal agencies, and for state and local health care programs.

Rinaldo served on various committees at the National Association of Social Workers and was a key member of the Committee on the Study of Competence from 1963 to 1970. She was on the Academy of Certified Social Workers (ACSW) Board that developed the first examinations for the ACSW. She was also active in the American Public Welfare Association and the Council on Social Work Education.
