= KWSL =

- Sioux City, Iowa; United States
- Frequency: 1470 kHz
- Branding: La Preciosa 98.7 FM y 1470 AM

Programming
- Format: Spanish adult hits

Ownership
- Owner: iHeartMedia, Inc.; (iHM Licenses, LLC)
- Sister stations: KGLI, KMNS, KSEZ, KSFT-FM

History
- First air date: 1938
- Former call signs: KTRI (1938–1980s); KKSC (1994-1995)

Technical information
- Licensing authority: FCC
- Facility ID: 8769
- Class: D
- Power: 2,300 watts day 69 watts night
- Transmitter coordinates: 42°24′42″N 96°25′30″W
- Translator: 98.7 K254DL (Sioux City)

Links
- Public license information: Public file; LMS
- Webcast: Listen Live
- Website: lapreciosa987.iheart.com

KWSL (1470 AM) is an American radio station licensed to serve the community of Sioux City, Iowa. The station is owned by iHeartMedia and the broadcast license is held by iHM Licenses, LLC. It formerly aired the 24/7 syndicated Comedy format. Presently the station broadcasts in Spanish and calls itself "La Preciosa".

== History ==
KWSL established its roots in Sioux City on June 20, 1938, originally launching under the call letters KTRI. The station was a local independent fixture for decades, serving as a primary source for community news and "home town" reporting during the mid-20th century.

In the 1980s, the station transitioned to the KWSL call sign and became a dominant Top 40 station in the Siouxland region.. On August 15, 1994, the station briefly changed its call letters to KKSC as part of a format shift, but returned to the heritage KWSL branding on October 2, 1995.

In the early 21st century, under the ownership of Clear Channel (now iHeartMedia), the station experimented with various formats, including a 24/7 syndicated comedy feed. It eventually settled into its current Spanish adult hits format, operating under the brand "La Preciosa."
