= Godfrey Hattenbach =

German-American businessman and city founder (1813–1879)

- Born: March 13, 1813; Darmstadt, Hesse-Darmstadt, Germany
- Died: August 12, 1879 (aged 66); Sioux City, Iowa
- Spouse: Frances Hattenbach
- Children: 7

Godfrey Hattenbach (March 13, 1813 – August 12, 1879) was a German-American businessman who is credited with taking part in the founding of three towns.

== Personal life and death ==
Hattenbach was born on March 13, 1813, in Darmstadt, Hesse-Darmstadt, Germany. He married Frances Hattenbach in Baltimore, Maryland, and they had seven children. Hattenbach is said to be the father of Sioux City, Iowa's Jewish community by the Sioux City Journal and the book A History of the Sioux City Jewish Community 1869 – 1969, originally moving there in 1858. He died on August 12, 1879, in Sioux City.

== Career ==
When he was 26, Hattenbach began working as a peddler and laborer in Baltimore, Maryland. Due to his dislike of the labor, he traveled to Missouri in 1848 to peddle, helped lay out the town of St. Joseph, and operated a general store in the town. From 1852 to 1853 in Cincinnati, Ohio, Hattenbach worked in the businesses of auctions and commissions. He then moved to Council Bluffs, Iowa, and opened a general store there. After leaving Council Bluffs, he helped found the town Omadi, Nebraska in 1855, living there for two years. In 1857, Hattenbach laid out Covington, Nebraska and founded a hotel there. Despite originally wanting to stay in Covington, Hattenbach left due to a storm destroying his hotel twice. Another storm completely leveled Omadi, and Covington became part of South Sioux City, Nebraska. Hattenbach made enough money as a fisherman to open the first billiard room in Sioux City, Iowa in 1858.

He later raised a hefty amount of funds, and he might have moved back to Cincinnati because of a report of Native Americans invading. He started a cigar manufacturing business in Cincinnati and operated it for three years. Hattenbach then returned to Sioux City. In 1869, a Jewish group built a cemetery on land that Hattenbach donated.
