= KGLI =

Radio station in Sioux City, Iowa

Coordinates: 42.515°N 96.304°W

- Sioux City, Iowa; United States
- Broadcast area: Sioux City, Iowa
- Frequency: 95.5 MHz
- Branding: KG95

Programming
- Format: Adult contemporary
- Affiliations: Premiere Networks

Ownership
- Owner: iHeartMedia, Inc.; (iHM Licenses, LLC)
- Sister stations: KMNS, KSEZ, KSFT-FM, KWSL

History
- First air date: 1974 (as KBCM)
- Former call signs: KBCM (1974–1983)
- Call sign meaning: KG 95 LI

Technical information
- Licensing authority: FCC
- Facility ID: 8771
- Class: C1
- ERP: 100,000 watts
- HAAT: 274 meters (899 ft)

Links
- Public license information: Public file; LMS
- Webcast: Listen Live
- Website: kg95.iheart.com

KGLI (95.5 FM; "KG95") is a radio station broadcasting an adult contemporary format. The station serves Sioux City, Iowa, United States, and is owned by iHeartMedia (formerly Clear Channel Communications).

== History ==
The station signed on the air in 1974 as KBCM. In 1983 the station became KGLI with a Top 40 (CHR) format as "KG95". Some of the original live air talent from the '80s included Mark Hahn, Paul Fredricks, Duke Williams, Paul Davis, Donnie Roberts, Rick Elliott, Doug Collins, Rick Allen, Matt Thombstone, and Glenn Miller. The station remained a Top 40 station until tweaking to hot adult contemporary on March 13, 2006, when co-owned adult contemporary KSFT-FM switched to Top 40 as "107.1 Kiss FM". By 2009, KGLI shifted to an Adult Contemporary format. KG95 has been a consistent leader in their core demo of woman 25-54 during their 25-year presence in Sioux City. In February 2010, KG95 began carrying Delilah's love songs program at night which KSFT used to carry before flipping to top 40.

== Management ==
- General Manager: vacant
- Operations Manager: Rob Powers
- Program Director: Rob Powers
