= KSUX =

Radio station in Winnebago, Nebraska, serving Sioux City, Iowa

Coordinates: 42.342°N 96.521°W

- Winnebago, Nebraska; United States
- Broadcast area: Sioux City, Iowa
- Frequency: 105.7 MHz
- Branding: KSUX 105.7

Programming
- Format: Country

Ownership
- Owner: Powell Broadcasting; (KSUX/KSCJ Radio Broadcasting Co.)
- Sister stations: KLEM, KKYY, KQNU, KKMA, KSCJ

History
- First air date: 1990
- Call sign meaning: ICAO airport code for Sioux Gateway Airport or SioUX

Technical information
- Licensing authority: FCC
- Class: C2
- ERP: 50,000 watts
- HAAT: 141 meters

Links
- Public license information: Public file; LMS
- Webcast: Listen Live
- Website: www.ksux.com

KSUX (105.7 FM, "The Super Pig") is a radio station broadcasting a country format. The station is licensed to Winnebago, Nebraska, and serves Sioux City, Iowa. KSUX is owned by Powell Broadcasting.

== History ==
After receiving its construction permit in 1988, KSUX began broadcasting in the summer of 1990. The station was owned by Violet Communications and broadcast a country format. Violet sold the station in 1991 to Flagship Communications, owners of KSCJ, which relocated the station from a facility near Southern Hills Mall to the KSCJ studios on Indian Hills Drive; the acquisition also saw Flagship divest Yankton-based KBCM to Park Communications. Flagship sold the station to DCP Broadcasting, and Powell acquired KSUX and KSCJ in a $3.8 million purchase in 1995.
