= KMNS =

Radio station in Sioux City, Iowa

- Sioux City, Iowa; United States
- Frequency: 620 kHz
- Branding: Fox Sports Radio 620

Programming
- Format: Sports
- Affiliations: Fox Sports Radio; Minnesota Vikings; Sioux City Musketeers

Ownership
- Owner: iHeartMedia, Inc.; (iHM Licenses, LLC)
- Sister stations: KGLI; KSEZ; KSFT-FM; KWSL

History
- First air date: May 1, 1949
- Former call signs: KCOM (1949–1954)
- Call sign meaning: "Music, News and Sports"

Technical information
- Licensing authority: FCC
- Facility ID: 10775
- Class: B
- Power: 1,000 watts
- Transmitter coordinates: 42°22′25″N 96°26′54.1″W

Links
- Public license information: Public file; LMS
- Webcast: Listen live (via iHeartRadio)
- Website: 620kmns.iheart.com

KMNS (620 AM) is a radio station in Sioux City, Iowa, United States, broadcasting a sports format. The station is owned by iHeartMedia and affiliated with its Fox Sports Radio network. iHeart's studios in Sioux City are located on Nebraska Avenue, and the transmitter is located southwest of Dakota City, Nebraska.

== History ==
On October 29, 1946, Commercial Associates, Inc., filed with the Federal Communications Commission (FCC) to build a new radio station on 620 kHz in Sioux City. The FCC granted the application on April 28, 1947, In late 1948, Dietrich Dirks, former stockholder and manager of station KTRI, acquired control of the new station, and KCOM began broadcasting on May 1, 1949 from studios in the Insurance Exchange Building. It focused on news, sports, music, and farm features. Dirks also applied in 1952 for television channel 4, KSCJ also applied, and in December 1953, the two stations agreed to combine their bids in order to bypass a lengthy comparative hearing, with the added wrinkle that the KCOM Broadcasting Company would not only sell half of its shares to KSCJ but would sell off KCOM.

In October 1954, the Siouxland Broadcasting Company, controlled by the Johns family, acquired KCOM. William F. Johns managed WOSH in Oshkosh, Wisconsin. To emphasize the format, the new owners changed the call letters on January 1, 1955, to KMNS—"Music, News and Sports". Three years, Johns sold the station to James Stuart of Lincoln, Nebraska, for $175,000.

Stuart expanded by purchasing FM station KDVR (97.9 FM) in 1974 and relaunching it as KSEZ "Stereo 98" with an easy listening format. Five years later, Stuart sold both stations to Sentry Broadcasting, a division of Wisconsin-based Sentry Insurance, for $1.8 million. The format changed from Top 40 to country music in 1982. In 1984, Sentry embarked on a $200,000 rehabilitation of the transmission facility in Dakota City, adding modern-day equipment, preparing for potential AM stereo deployment, and also laying the groundwork for a possible power increase to 2,500 watts. Two years later, it sold the pair to Sage Broadcasting of Stamford, Connecticut; at the same time, it sold off three of its six other broadcasting operations. Sage retained the pair for three years, selling to Legend Communications in 1989; the stations were then sold to Chesterman Communications in 1992 after a previous attempt by the same buyer to purchase them the year before fell through.

After the enactment of the Telecommunications Act of 1996, which relaxed limits on radio station ownership, Chesterman and the Cardinal Communications cluster of KGLI and KWSL combined operations. The station added sports programming at night, initially from ESPN Radio, in 1998. By the end of the decade, KMNS had shifted to a full-on news/talk format, mostly relying on local news and syndicated national talk shows.

Clear Channel, predecessor to iHeartMedia, acquired the Sioux City cluster from Radioworks (the former Chesterman Communications) for $12 million in 2000. Fox Sports programming moved to KMNS in 2005 as part of a refocusing of KMNS and KWSL, which resulted in the flip of KWSL to a Spanish-language format.
