= Bob Scott (mayor) =

American businessman and politician

56th and 64th Mayor of Sioux City, Iowa
- Incumbent
- Assumed office January 1, 2012
- Preceded by: Mike Hobart
- In office January 1, 1990 – January 1, 1998
- Preceded by: Loren Callendar
- Succeeded by: Tom Padgett

Personal details
- Born: Robert Scott; May 22, 1951 (age 75) Sioux City, Iowa, U.S.
- Party: Non-partisan

Robert "Bob" Scott (born May 22, 1951) is an American businessman and politician from the state of Iowa. Scott is one of the longest-serving mayors of Sioux City, Iowa, having served a combined 20 years as the city's top elected official.

== Early life and education ==
Scott, was born May 10, 1951, in Sioux City, Iowa. He graduated from East High School in 1969.

== Career ==
=== Business ===
Scott is the owner of the R.E. Scott Company, a tax preparation service established in 1982, as well as a commercial insurance agency, Business Insurers of Iowa. For over 20 years, Scott was the majority owner of the Sioux City Bandits, a team in the Champions Indoor Football (CIF) league.

=== Politics ===
Scott was first elected to the Sioux City city council in November 1986, leading a field of six candidates in the field for three non-partisan seats with a tally of just over 8,400 votes. He was sworn in for the four-year term along with fellow newcomers Stanley W. Evans and Joanne Grueskin to the five member council on December 29 of that year, with the term scheduled to begin on the first of the year. Scott quickly emerged as a fiscal conservative, casting the lone dissenting vote against the city's $46.5 million operating budget for fiscal year 1986-87, declaring that the council had failed its responsibility to make significant spending cuts.

In March 1989 Scott drew fire along with fellow city council members Grueskin and Evans when they were sued by the Iowa Freedom of Information Council and the Greater Sioux City Press club for allegedly having skirted Iowa's open meeting law by having met with a candidate for interim city manager in October 1986 in South Sioux City, Nebraska. Iowa law prohibited gatherings of the city council without the posting of a meeting announcement and publication of a meeting agenda. In attempting to dodge these provisions by secretly meeting with retired Midwest Energy Company executive Frank Griffith across the river in Nebraska, the trio (along with a fourth council member, the late Cornelius "Connie" Bodine) had nevertheless run afoul of Iowa's restrictive open meeting requirements, the lawsuit charged. Scott and his colleagues were cleared of the charge in April 1989 when Judge Richard J. Vipond ruled that the conclave did not constitute a "meeting" according to Iowa code; the lawsuit was therefore dismissed with prejudice.

In September 1989, Scott announced his decision to run for a second four-year term on the Sioux City city council, indicating a desire to expand the number of industrial jobs in the community and pledging to hold the line on city utility rates and property taxes.

The mayoral election of 2011 was especially popular among Sioux City's voters because it was between Scott and former mayor Tom Padgett. The election would come close in the primaries with Padgett leading 2% over Scott. However, Scott received the support of former Sioux City mayor Jim Wharton and many other local officials. The November 8th election saw Scott beat Padgett by 113 votes, 5304 to 5191 respectively.

In 2015, Scott ran unopposed for reelection along with councilwoman Rhonda Capron who also regained her seat.

Scott also won Sioux City's 2019 mayoral election, against Sioux City Public Schools teacher Maria Rundquist, with 6,421 votes or 68%.
