= KKYY =

Radio station in Whiting, Iowa

- Whiting, Iowa; United States
- Broadcast area: Sioux City, Iowa
- Frequency: 101.3 MHz
- Branding: Y Country 101.3

Programming
- Format: Classic country

Ownership
- Owner: Powell Broadcasting Company, Inc.
- Sister stations: KSUX, KLEM, KQNU, KKMA, KSCJ

History
- First air date: 1980
- Former call signs: KBWH (1980-1993); KISP (1993–2001)
- Former frequencies: 106.3 MHz (1980-1993); 101.5 MHz (1993-2001)

Technical information
- Licensing authority: FCC
- Facility ID: 63940
- Class: C2
- ERP: 50,000 watts
- HAAT: 150 meters (492 feet)
- Transmitter coordinates: 42°21′25″N 96°08′02″W

Links
- Public license information: Public file; LMS
- Webcast: Listen Live
- Website: y1013fm

KKYY (101.3 FM, "Y Country 101.3") is a radio station licensed to serve Whiting, Iowa. The station is owned by Powell Broadcasting Company, Inc. It airs a classic country format.

The station first went on the air as KBWH on 106.3 FM in December 1979, and was originally licensed to Blair, Nebraska. Due to the location of its transmitter (which, at the time, was located west of Modale), it also covered parts of the larger Omaha-Council Bluffs market. The station initially aired country and easy listening music.

In late 1982, new owners bought the station, and began targeting Omaha's African American community with an urban contemporary format early the next year. Due to station finances, as well as signal reception issues, the station was sold in January 1990, with new ownership refocusing the station back to Blair, and changed the station's format to adult contemporary in October of that year. Due to a signal upgrade for KIBZ in Lincoln, which also broadcasts on 106.3 FM, KBWH relocated to 101.5 FM, and changed call letters to KISP, in late 1993. In the late 1990s, the station would relocate its transmitter to a site near Herman, Nebraska.

In 2001, due to a power upgrade for KZFX (101.9 FM) in the Lincoln market, the station would be moved into the Sioux City market, relicensed to Whiting, and relocated to 101.3 FM. (As part of the move, KAYL-FM (101.7 FM) in Storm Lake reduced power to 50,000 watts. In addition, KISP's adult contemporary format would move to KBLR (97.3 FM).) The station adopted the KKYY call letters on September 7, 2001.
