= KQNU =

Radio station in Onawa, Iowa

Coordinates: 42.175°N 96.387°W

- Onawa, Iowa; United States
- Broadcast area: Sioux City, Iowa
- Frequency: 102.3 MHz
- Branding: Q102

Programming
- Format: Hot adult contemporary
- Affiliations: United Stations Radio Networks

Ownership
- Owner: Powell Broadcasting
- Sister stations: KSUX, KLEM, KKYY, KKMA, KSCJ

History
- First air date: 1989 (as KOOO)
- Former call signs: KBAO (1986–1987, CP); KOOO (1987–1998); KZSR (1998–2009)

Technical information
- Licensing authority: FCC
- Facility ID: 3971
- Class: C1
- ERP: 100,000 watts
- HAAT: 196 meters (643 ft)

Links
- Public license information: Public file; LMS
- Webcast: Listen live
- Website: q102siouxcity.com

KQNU (102.3 FM, "Q102") is a radio station broadcasting a hot adult contemporary format. The station is licensed to Onawa, Iowa, and serves Sioux City, Iowa. It broadcasts from a tower east of Walthill, Nebraska, on the Omaha Indian Reservation. KQNU is owned by Powell Broadcasting. The station had had the KZSR calls and previously been known as "Bob FM" until the name changed to Jack FM in September 2008.

On September 24, 2009, KZSR flipped to a modern AC format branded as "New 102.3" with the KQNU calls. The station has been known as “Q102” since August 31, 2012.
