= KSFT-FM =

Coordinates: 42.538°N 96.450°W

- South Sioux City, Nebraska; United States
- Broadcast area: Sioux City, Iowa
- Frequency: 107.1 MHz
- Branding: 107-1 KISS FM

Programming
- Format: Top 40 (CHR)
- Affiliations: Premiere Networks

Ownership
- Owner: iHeartMedia, Inc.; (iHM Licenses, LLC)
- Sister stations: KGLI, KMNS, KSEZ, KWSL

History
- First air date: 1996
- Call sign meaning: SofT 107 (former branding)

Technical information
- Licensing authority: FCC
- Facility ID: 10776
- Class: A
- ERP: 2,300 watts
- HAAT: 99 meters

Links
- Public license information: Public file; LMS
- Webcast: Listen Live
- Website: 1071kissfm.iheart.com

KSFT-FM (107.1 MHz) - branded as "107.1 KISS FM" - is a radio station broadcasting a Top 40 (CHR) format. Licensed to the suburb of South Sioux City, Nebraska, the station serves Sioux City, Iowa. The station is currently owned by iHeartMedia, Inc.

== History ==
KSFT-FM signed on with an adult contemporary (AC) format as "Soft 107" in 1996. The station remained an AC station until switching to Top 40 on March 13, 2006 when co-owned Top 40 KGLI "KG95" tweaked to hot adult contemporary.
