= KKMA =

Radio station in Iowa, US

- Le Mars, Iowa; United States
- Broadcast area: Sioux City, Iowa
- Frequency: 99.5 MHz
- Branding: Classic Rock 99.5

Programming
- Format: Classic rock
- Affiliations: United Stations Radio Networks

Ownership
- Owner: Powell Broadcasting
- Sister stations: KSUX, KLEM, KKYY, KQNU, KSCJ

History
- First air date: 1989

Technical information
- Licensing authority: FCC
- Facility ID: 35055
- Class: C1
- ERP: 100,000 watts
- HAAT: 241 meters (791 ft)
- Transmitter coordinates: 42°28′56″N 96°15′31″W

Links
- Public license information: Public file; LMS
- Webcast: Listen Live
- Website: classicrock995.com

KKMA (99.5 FM, "Classic Rock 99.5") is a radio station broadcasting a classic rock format. The station is licensed to Le Mars, Iowa, and serves Sioux City, Iowa. KKMA is owned by Powell Broadcasting.

== History ==
KKMA signed on in 1989 with an oldies format known as "Kool 99.5". Kool 99.5 later morphed into classic hits by 2004, and classic rock by 2006 successfully competing with Clear Channel's KSEZ "Z98" for the lucrative upper demographics in Sioux City and continues to do so.
