= KSEZ =

Coordinates: 42.482°N 96.259°W

- Sioux City, Iowa; United States
- Broadcast area: Sioux City, Iowa
- Frequency: 97.9 MHz
- Branding: Z98

Programming
- Format: Active rock

Ownership
- Owner: iHeartMedia, Inc.; (iHM Licenses, LLC)
- Sister stations: KGLI, KMNS, KSFT-FM, KWSL

History
- First air date: February 6, 1961
- Former call signs: KDVR (1960–1974)
- Call sign meaning: From easy listening format 1974–1976

Technical information
- Licensing authority: FCC
- Facility ID: 10777
- Class: C1
- ERP: 100,000 watts
- HAAT: 196 meters (643 ft)

Links
- Public license information: Public file; LMS
- Webcast: Listen live
- Website: z98rocks.iheart.com

KSEZ (97.9 FM, "Z98") is a radio station broadcasting an active rock format. The station serves Sioux City, Iowa and is owned by iHeartMedia. KSEZ primarily competes with Powell Broadcasting's KKMA "Classic Rock 99.5".

== History ==
Edwin C. Wolff of Sioux City filed on August 13, 1960, for a construction permit to build a new FM radio station in Sioux City. Wolff announced that his sons, John and Daniel, would be heavily involved in the new station's operation; John ran a hi-fi radio store and was a symphony concertmaster in town. The Federal Communications Commission (FCC) granted the application on October 5, less than two months later, and KDVR began broadcasting on February 6, 1961. Originally operating with 3,000 watts, the station upgraded to 38,000 watts in 1964.

In 1973, Stuart Enterprises, owner of KMNS (620 AM), purchased KDVR from Wolff. KDVR relaunched as easy listening station KSEZ "Stereo 98" that July. An increase in effective radiated power from 38,000 to 62,000 watts went into effect in November 1975, increasing KSEZ's coverage area. However, the easy listening format turned out to be unable to attract significant advertiser support in the market; as a result, on February 23, 1976, the station flipped to rock.

Stuart sold its two Sioux City stations to Sentry Broadcasting, a division of Wisconsin-based Sentry Insurance, for $1.8 million in 1979. In 1986, a carousel of changing ownership began for KMNS and KSEZ as Sentry sold the pair to Sage Broadcasting of Stamford, Connecticut; at the same time, it sold off three of its six other broadcasting operations. Sage retained the pair for three years, selling to Legend Communications in 1989; the stations were then sold to Chesterman Communications in 1992 after a previous attempt by the same buyer to purchase them the year before fell through.

After the enactment of the Telecommunications Act of 1996, which relaxed limits on radio station ownership, Chesterman and the Cardinal Communications cluster of KGLI and KWSL combined operations. Chesterman later purchased the other stations and changed its name to Radioworks. Clear Channel, predecessor to iHeartMedia, acquired the Sioux City cluster from Radioworks for $12 million in 2000.
