= Sioux City, Iowa =

- City
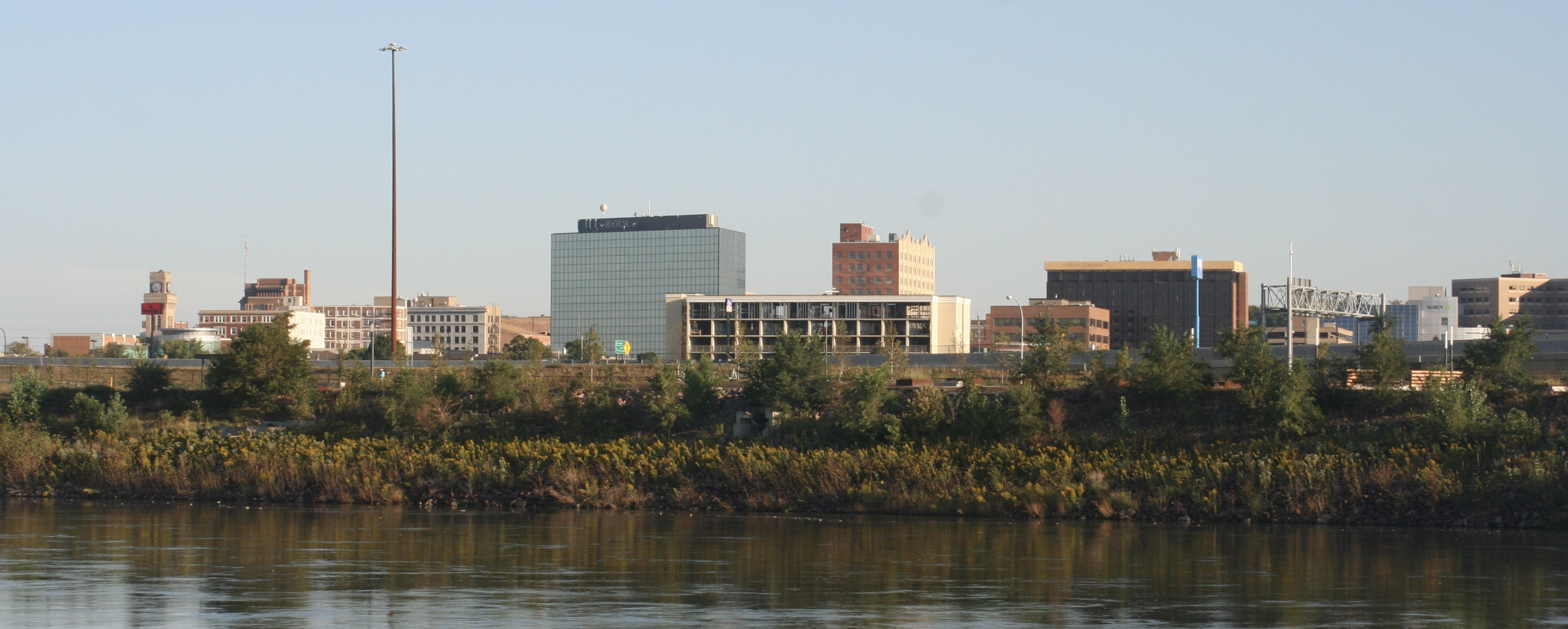
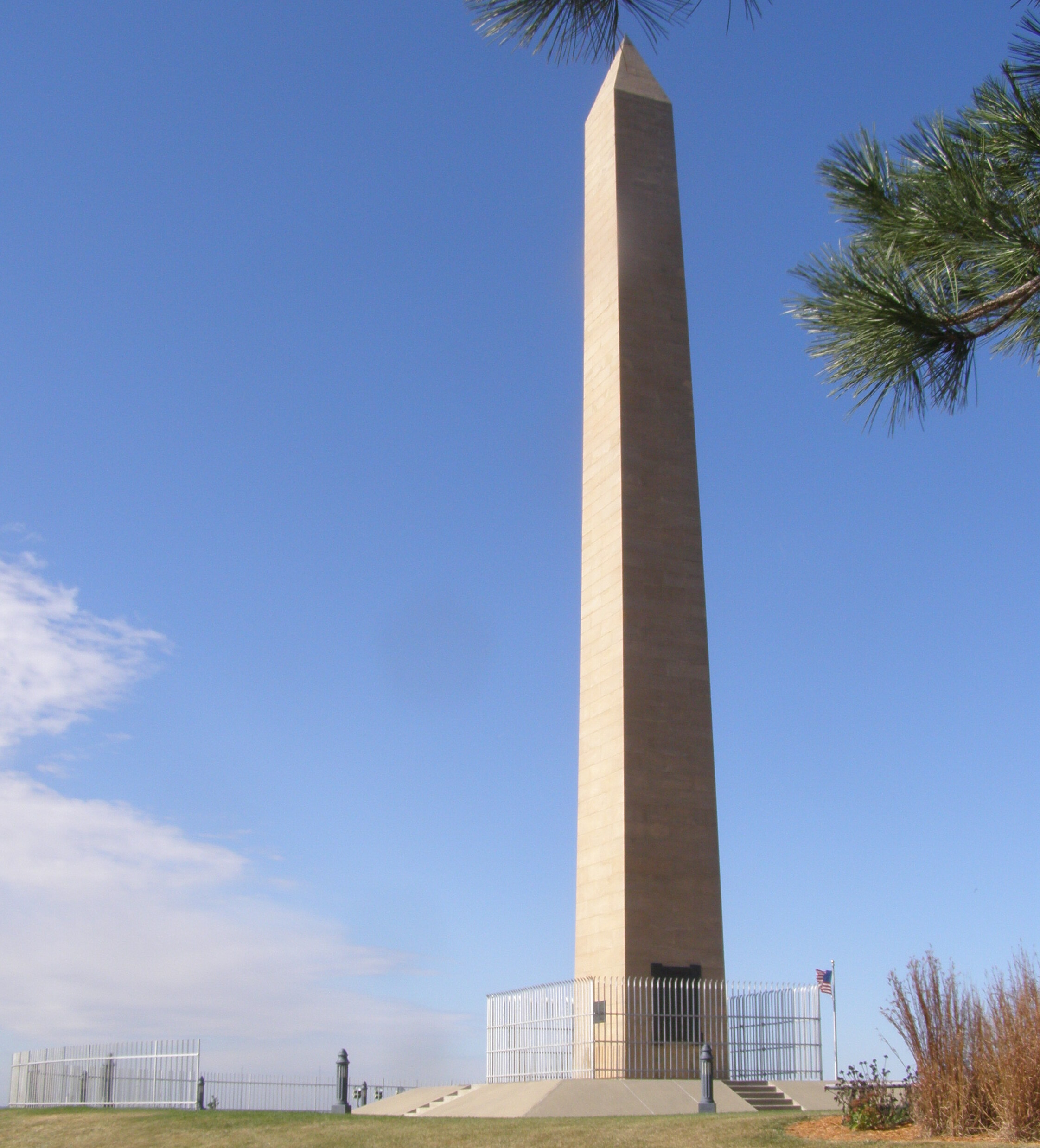
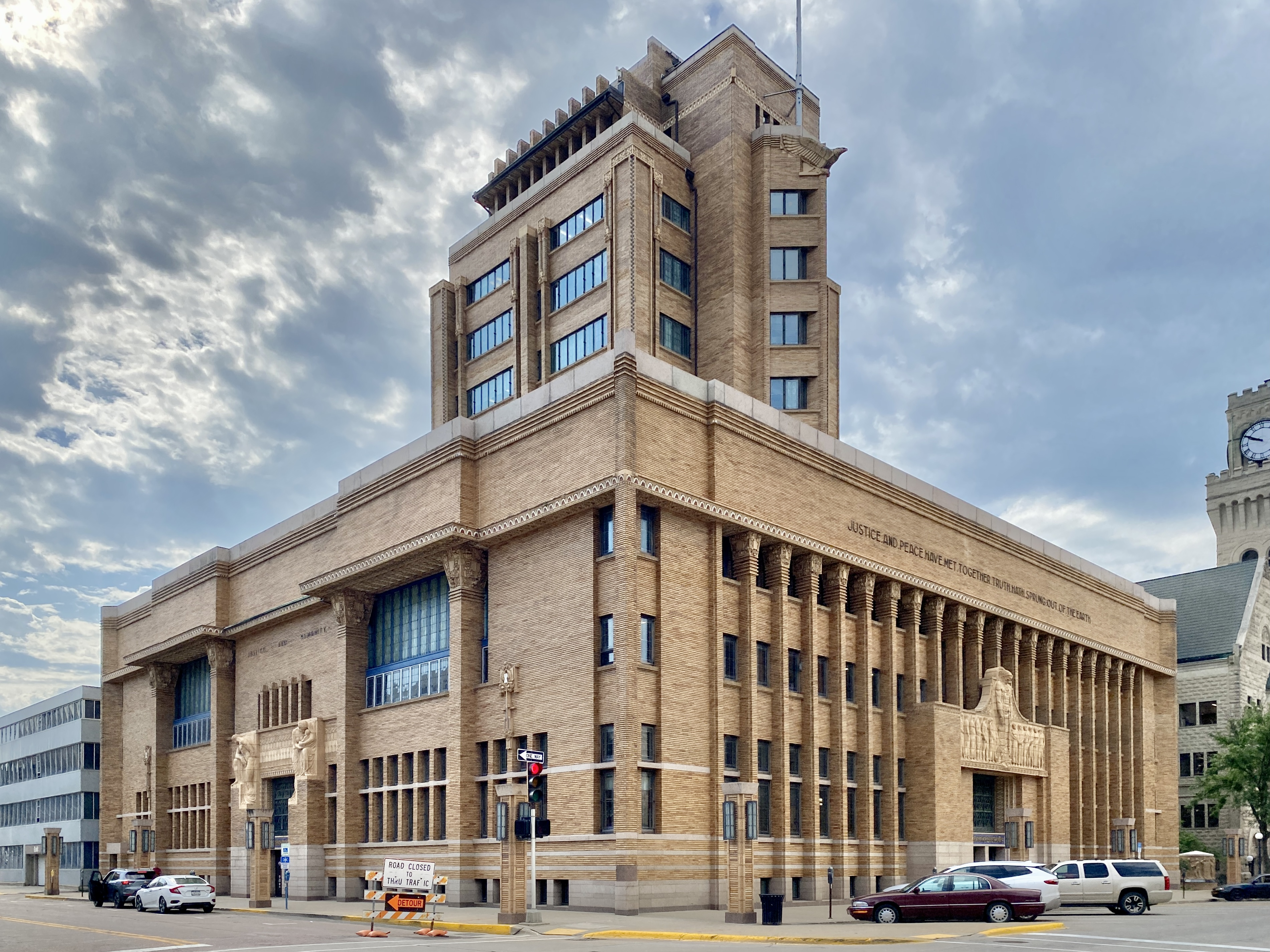
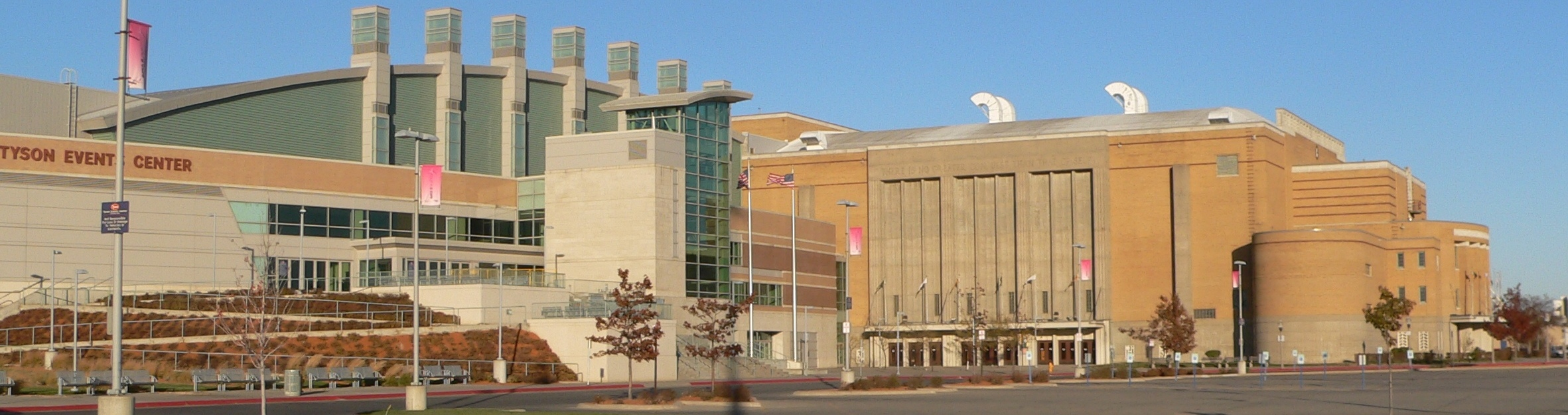
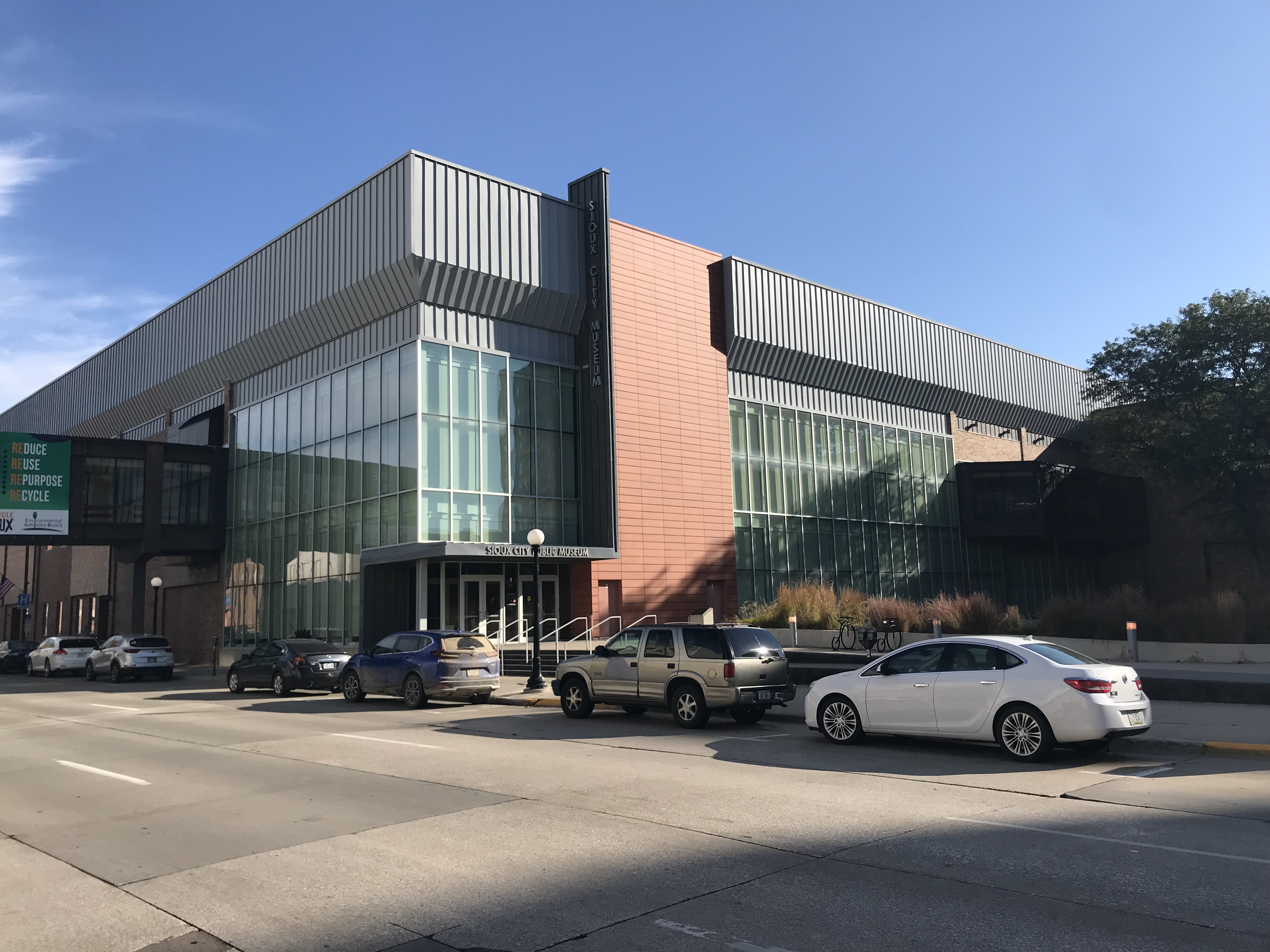
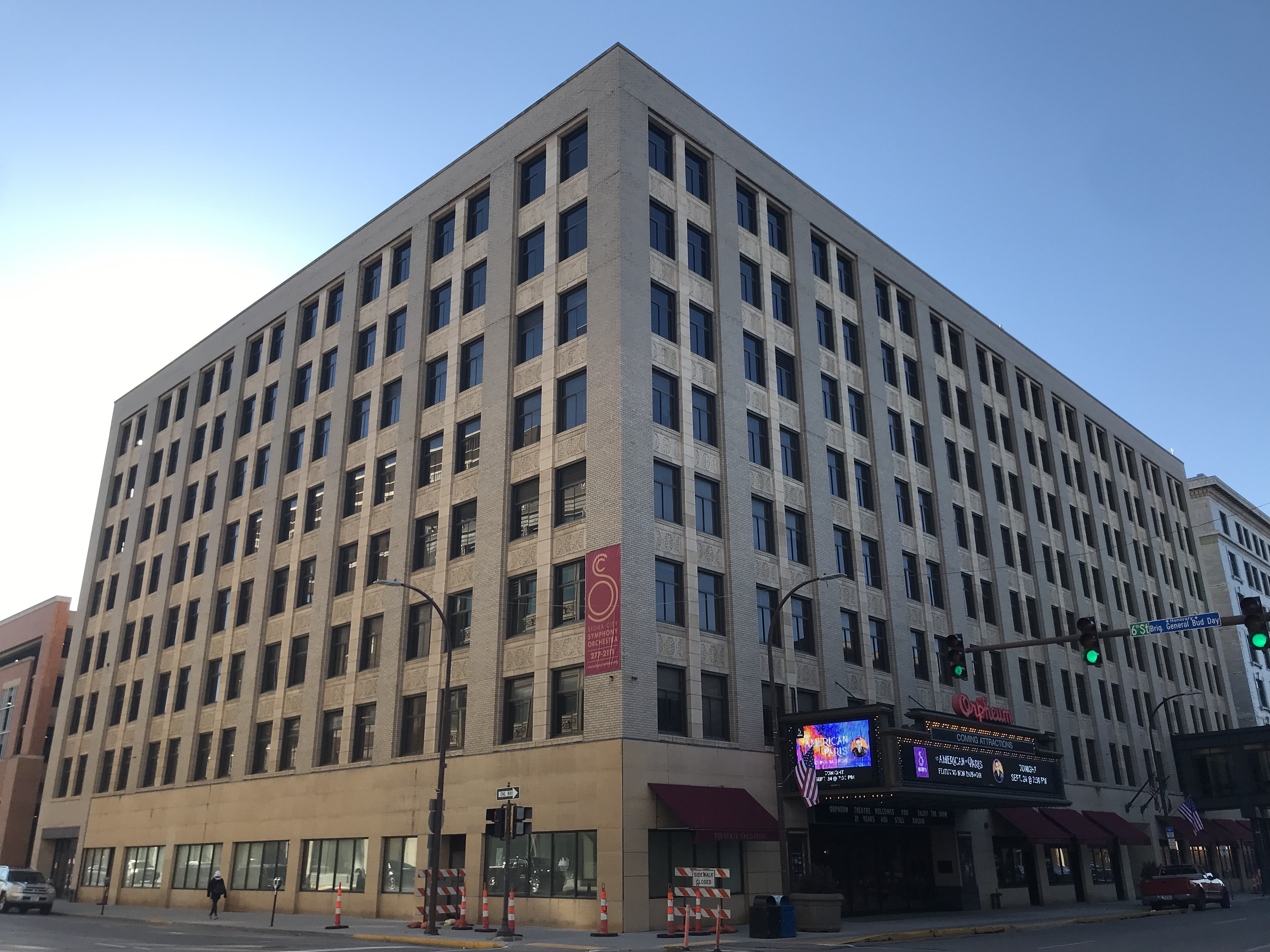
- Sioux City Skyline and Missouri River Sergeant Floyd Monument Woodbury County Courthouse Tyson Events Center Sioux City Public Museum Orpheum Theatre

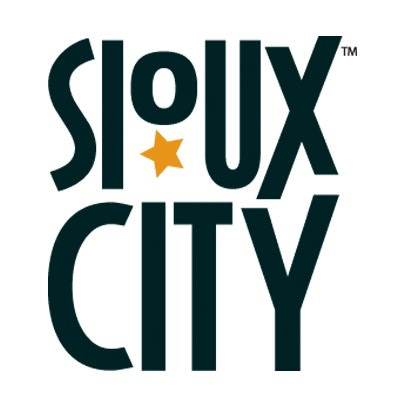
- Logo
- Interactive map of Sioux City, Iowa
- Location within Iowa Location within the United States
- Coordinates: 42°29′47″N 96°24′18″W
- Country: United States
- State: Iowa
- Counties: Woodbury, Plymouth
- Founded: 1854
- Incorporated: January 16, 1857

Government
  - Type: Mayor–council
  - Mayor: Bob Scott
  - Mayor Pro-Tem: Julie Schoenherr
  - City manager: Mike Collett
  - City Council: Ike Rayford; Craig Berenstein; Rick Bertrand

Area
  - City: 60.556 sq mi (156.839 km^{2})
  - Land: 59.388 sq mi (153.813 km^{2})
  - Water: 1.169 sq mi (3.027 km^{2}) 1.93%
- Elevation: 1,102 ft (336 m)

Population (2020)
  - City: 85,797
  - Estimate (2024): 86,875
  - Rank: US: 414th; IA: 4th
  - Density: 1,444.7/sq mi (557.80/km^{2})
  - Urban: 113,066 (US: 298th)
  - Metro: 145,994 (US: 295th)
  - Combined: 171,819 (US: 152nd)
- Time zone: UTC−6 (Central (CST))
  - Summer (DST): UTC−5 (CDT)
- ZIP Codes: 51101–51106, 51108–51109, 51111
- Area code: 712
- FIPS code: 19-73335
- Website: sioux-city.org

Sioux City (/suː/ SOO) is a city in Woodbury and Plymouth counties in the U.S. state of Iowa. The population was 85,797 at the 2020 census, and was estimated at 86,875 in 2024, making it the fourth-most populous city in Iowa. The county seat of Woodbury County, Sioux City is the primary city of the five-county Sioux City metropolitan area, which had 144,334 residents on the 2020 census. Sioux City and the surrounding areas of northwestern Iowa, northeastern Nebraska and southeastern South Dakota are sometimes referred to collectively as Siouxland.

Sioux City is located at the navigational head of the Missouri River. The city is home to several cultural points of interest including the Sioux City Public Museum, Sioux City Art Center and Sergeant Floyd Monument, which is a National Historic Landmark. The city is also home to Chris Larsen Park, commonly referred to as "the Riverfront", which includes the Anderson Dance Pavilion, Sergeant Floyd River Museum & Welcome Center and Lewis and Clark Interpretive Center.

== History ==
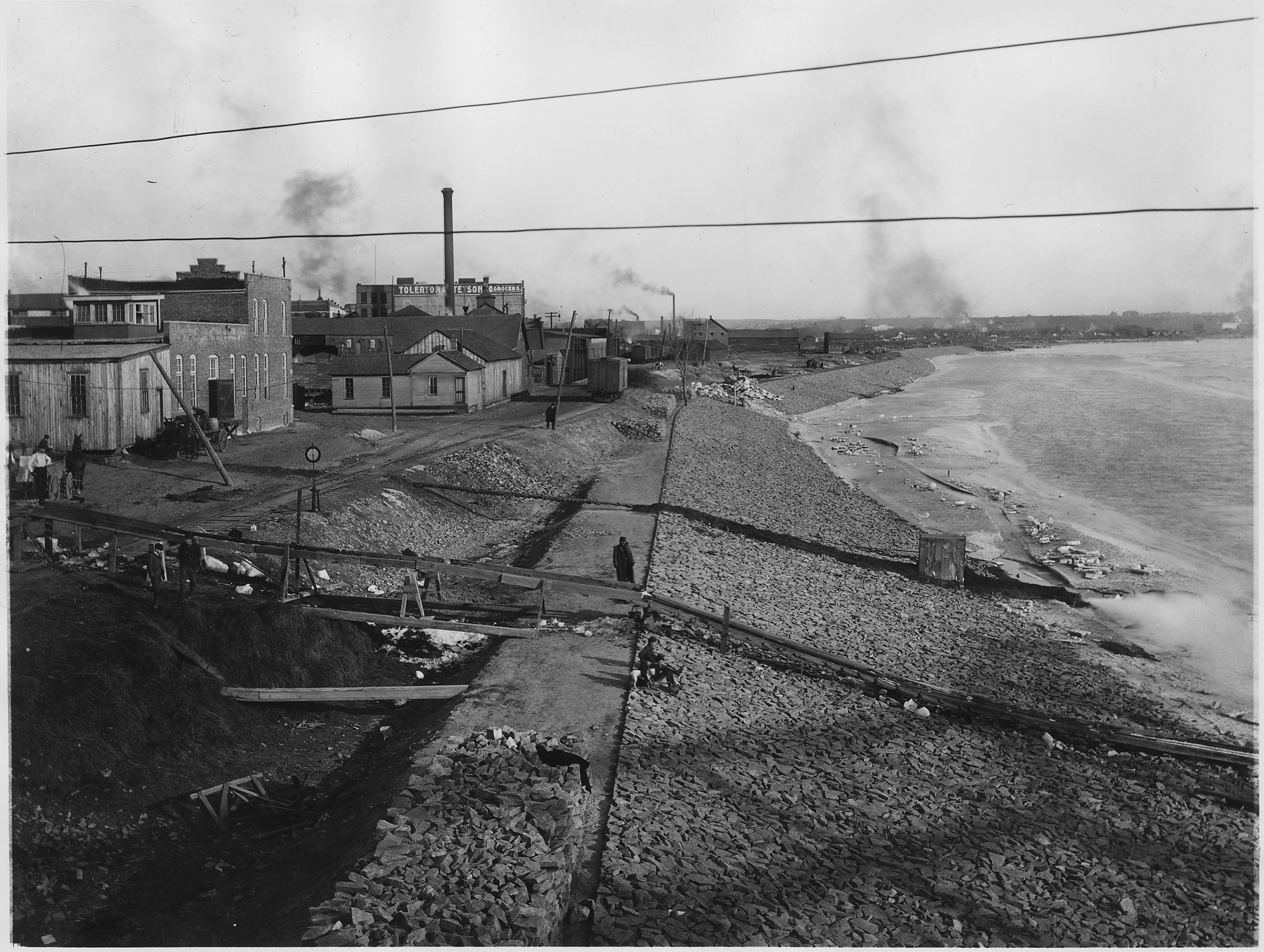
Waterfront, c. 1912

Iowa is in the tallgrass prairie of the North American Great Plains, historically inhabited by speakers of Siouan languages. The area of Sioux City was inhabited by Yankton Sioux when it was first reached by Spanish and French furtrappers in the 18th century. The first documented US citizens to record their travels through this area were Meriwether Lewis and William Clark during the summer of 1804. Sergeant Charles Floyd, a member of the Lewis and Clark Expedition, died here on August 20, 1804, the only death during the two and a half-year expedition.

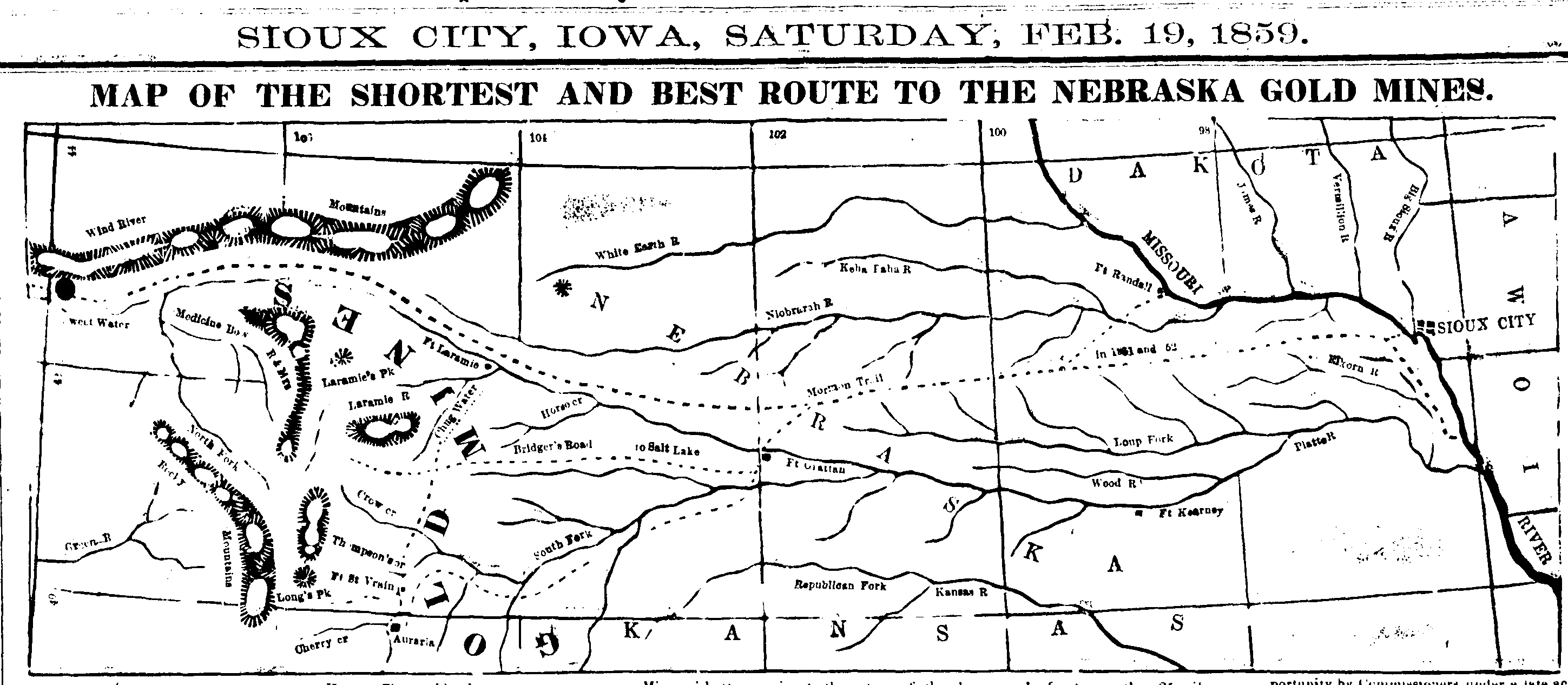
1859 map of route from Sioux City, Iowa, through Nebraska, to gold fields of Wyoming, partially following old Mormon trails

Sioux City was laid out in the winter of 1854–1855. It became a major transportation hub to the western Plains, including Mormons heading to Salt Lake City and speculators heading to Wyoming goldfields.

In 1891, the Sioux City Elevated Railway was opened and became the third steam-powered elevated rapid transit system in the world, and later the first electric-powered elevated railway in the world after conversion in 1892. However, the system fell into bankruptcy and closed within a decade.

Russian Jewish immigrants founded Adath Yeshurun in 1896 and erected Sioux City's first Orthodox synagogue. Its members made several furnishings, including an elaborate 1899 wooden Torah ark carved by immigrant peddler Abraham Shulkin in an Eastern European style.

The city gained the nickname "Little Chicago" during the Prohibition era due to its reputation for being a purveyor of alcoholic beverages.

On July 19, 1989, United Airlines Flight 232 crash-landed at Sioux Gateway Airport. 112 people on board the aircraft were killed, but 184 survived the crash and ensuing fire due to outstandingly quick performances by fire and emergency local teams.

According to a 2015 University of Iowa study for the Iowa Initiative for Sustainable Communities, blight and disinvestment are serious problems in the downtown core as investment has shifted to suburbs.

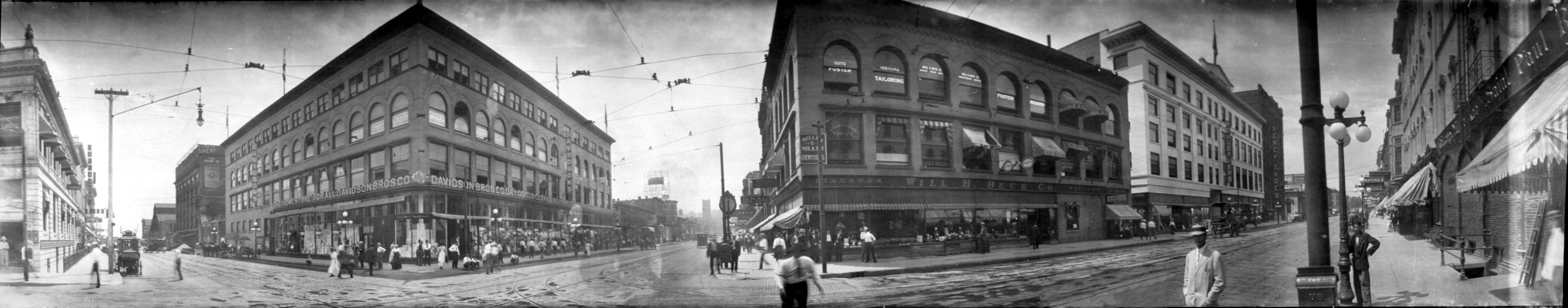
Sioux City, 1911

== Geography ==
Sioux City borders two states, South Dakota to the northwest and Nebraska to the southwest.

According to the United States Census Bureau, the city has a total area of 60.556 square miles (156.84 km^{2}), of which 59.387 square miles (153.81 km^{2}) is land and 1.169 square miles (3.03 km^{2}) (1.93%) is water.

=== Climate ===
As is typical of Iowa, Sioux City has a humid continental climate, with very warm, humid summers, cold, dry winters, and wide temperature extremes; it is part of USDA Hardiness zone 5a. The normal monthly mean temperature ranges from 20.0 °F (−6.7 °C) in January to 74.2 °F (23.4 °C) in July. On average, there are 25 days that reach 90 °F (32 °C) or higher, 52 days that do not climb above freezing, and 17 days with a low of 0 °F (−18 °C) or below annually. The average window for freezing temperatures is October 1 through April 26, allowing a growing season of 157 days. Extreme temperatures officially range from −35 °F (−37 °C) on January 12, 1912, up to 111 °F (44 °C) on July 4, 1936, and July 17, 1936, as well as July 11, 1939; the record cold daily maximum is −22 °F (−30 °C) on February 8, 1899, while, conversely, the record warm daily minimum is 86 °F (30 °C) on August 18, 1936. On May 14, 2013, the high temperature reached 106 °F (41 °C), setting a new all-time May record high, along with a 77 °F (43 °C) rise from the morning of the 12th, just two weeks after the city’s first measurable snowfall (1.6 inches (4.1 cm) on May 1) recorded in the month of May.

Precipitation is greatest in May and June and averages 29.27 inches (743 mm) annually but has ranged from 14.33 inches (364 mm) in 1976 to 41.10 inches (1,044 mm) in 1903. Snowfall averages 36.0 inches (91 cm) per season, and has historically ranged from 6.9 inches (18 cm) in 1895–1896 to 65.9 inches (167 cm) in 1961–1962; the average window for measurable (≥0.1 inches or 0.25 centimetres) snowfall is November 8 through April 7, although snow in October occurs several times per decade.

Climate data for Sioux City, Iowa (Sioux Gateway Airport), 1991–2020 normals, extremes 1889–present
Month	Jan	Feb	Mar	Apr	May	Jun	Jul	Aug	Sep	Oct	Nov	Dec	Year
Record high °F (°C)	71 (22)	75 (24)	95 (35)	98 (37)	106 (41)	108 (42)	111 (44)	108 (42)	103 (39)	96 (36)	82 (28)	71 (22)	111 (44)
Mean maximum °F (°C)	52.2 (11.2)	57.9 (14.4)	74.7 (23.7)	85.7 (29.8)	92.5 (33.6)	95.4 (35.2)	95.3 (35.2)	94.1 (34.5)	91.6 (33.1)	85.3 (29.6)	70.3 (21.3)	54.4 (12.4)	98.3 (36.8)
Mean daily maximum °F (°C)	29.5 (−1.4)	34.2 (1.2)	47.6 (8.7)	61.1 (16.2)	72.3 (22.4)	81.9 (27.7)	85.0 (29.4)	82.6 (28.1)	76.6 (24.8)	62.8 (17.1)	46.8 (8.2)	33.4 (0.8)	59.5 (15.3)
Daily mean °F (°C)	20.0 (−6.7)	24.5 (−4.2)	36.7 (2.6)	48.9 (9.4)	60.5 (15.8)	70.7 (21.5)	74.2 (23.4)	71.7 (22.1)	63.9 (17.7)	50.3 (10.2)	35.9 (2.2)	24.1 (−4.4)	48.4 (9.1)
Mean daily minimum °F (°C)	10.4 (−12.0)	14.8 (−9.6)	25.9 (−3.4)	36.7 (2.6)	48.7 (9.3)	59.4 (15.2)	63.4 (17.4)	60.8 (16.0)	51.2 (10.7)	37.9 (3.3)	25.0 (−3.9)	14.8 (−9.6)	37.4 (3.0)
Mean minimum °F (°C)	−12.1 (−24.5)	−6.8 (−21.6)	4.1 (−15.5)	20.0 (−6.7)	33.4 (0.8)	46.3 (7.9)	51.2 (10.7)	49.2 (9.6)	34.3 (1.3)	20.2 (−6.6)	7.0 (−13.9)	−6.9 (−21.6)	−16.1 (−26.7)
Record low °F (°C)	−35 (−37)	−31 (−35)	−22 (−30)	−2 (−19)	23 (−5)	38 (3)	41 (5)	37 (3)	24 (−4)	5 (−15)	−9 (−23)	−28 (−33)	−35 (−37)
Average precipitation inches (mm)	0.69 (18)	0.86 (22)	1.76 (45)	3.15 (80)	3.87 (98)	4.35 (110)	3.35 (85)	3.94 (100)	2.84 (72)	2.20 (56)	1.27 (32)	0.99 (25)	29.27 (743)
Average snowfall inches (cm)	7.7 (20)	8.7 (22)	5.7 (14)	2.3 (5.8)	0.0 (0.0)	0.0 (0.0)	0.0 (0.0)	0.0 (0.0)	0.0 (0.0)	0.8 (2.0)	3.2 (8.1)	7.6 (19)	36.0 (91)
Average precipitation days (≥ 0.01 in)	6.8	6.5	8.1	10.0	12.0	11.7	9.0	9.8	8.0	7.6	5.9	6.8	102.2
Average snowy days (≥ 0.1 in)	5.9	5.7	3.4	1.4	0.0	0.0	0.0	0.0	0.0	0.5	2.5	5.4	24.8
Average relative humidity (%)	72.2	72.4	69.7	61.6	62.3	65.5	69.2	72.0	70.8	66.2	72.3	75.9	69.2
Mean monthly sunshine hours	171.1	165.5	211.9	232.3	271.8	310.2	330.9	292.9	235.5	209.3	146.4	138.3	2,716.1
Percentage possible sunshine	58	56	57	58	60	68	71	68	63	61	50	49	61
Source: NOAA (relative humidity and sun 1961–1990)

== Demographics ==
Historical population
Census	Pop.	Note	%±
1870	3,401		—
1880	7,366		116.6%
1890	37,806		413.3%
1900	33,111		−12.4%
1910	47,828		44.4%
1920	71,227		48.9%
1930	79,183		11.2%
1940	82,364		4.0%
1950	83,991		2.0%
1960	89,159		6.2%
1970	85,925		−3.6%
1980	82,003		−4.6%
1990	80,505		−1.8%
2000	85,013		5.6%
2010	82,684		−2.7%
2020	85,797		3.8%
2024 (est.)	86,875	▲	1.3%
U.S. Decennial Census; 2020 Census

According to realtor website Zillow, the average price of a home as of October 31, 2025, in Sioux City is $193,736.

As of the 2024 American Community Survey, there are 32,711 estimated households in Sioux City with an average of 2.59 persons per household. The city has a median household income of $74,972. Approximately 15.7% of the city's population lives at or below the poverty line. Sioux City has an estimated 65.6% employment rate, with 25.8% of the population holding a bachelor's degree or higher and 85.5% holding a high school diploma. There were 34,965 housing units at an average density of 588.77 per square mile (227.3/km^{2}).

=== Racial and ethnic composition ===
Sioux City, Iowa – racial and ethnic composition Note: the US Census treats Hispanic/Latino as an ethnic category. This table excludes Latinos from the racial categories and assigns them to a separate category. Hispanics/Latinos may be of any race.
Race / ethnicity (NH = non-Hispanic)	Pop. 1990	Pop. 2000	Pop. 2010	Pop. 2020	% 1990	% 2000	% 2010	% 2020
White alone (NH)	73,425	68,521	60,748	53,964	91.21%	80.60%	73.47%	62.90%
Black or African American alone (NH)	1,807	1,966	2,302	4,931	2.24%	2.31%	2.78%	5.75%
Native American or Alaska Native alone (NH)	1,412	1,450	1,685	1,771	1.75%	1.71%	2.04%	2.06%
Asian alone (NH)	1,166	2,385	2,231	2,755	1.45%	2.81%	2.70%	3.21%
Pacific Islander alone (NH)	—	20	98	631	—	0.02%	0.12%	0.74%
Other race alone (NH)	71	72	58	333	0.09%	0.08%	0.07%	0.39%
Mixed race or multiracial (NH)	—	1,342	1,964	3,451	—	1.58%	2.38%	4.02%
Hispanic or Latino (any race)	2,624	9,257	13,598	17,961	3.26%	10.89%	16.45%	20.93%
Total	80,505	85,013	82,684	85,797	100.00%	100.00%	100.00%	100.00%

=== 2020 census ===
As of the 2020 census, Sioux City had a population of 85,797, with 32,170 households and 20,217 families. The population density was 1,467.62 inhabitants per square mile (566.7/km^{2}). The median age was 34.7 years. 26.2% of residents were under the age of 18 and 14.7% were 65 years of age or older. For every 100 females there were 98.6 males, and for every 100 females age 18 and over there were 96.8 males age 18 and over.

97.1% of residents lived in urban areas, while 2.9% lived in rural areas.

There were 32,170 households, of which 33.0% had children under the age of 18 living in them. Of all households, 41.4% were married-couple households, 21.2% were households with a male householder and no spouse or partner present, and 28.9% were households with a female householder and no spouse or partner present. About 30.2% of all households were made up of individuals and 12.1% had someone living alone who was 65 years of age or older.

There were 34,331 housing units at an average density of 587.26 per square mile (226.7/km^{2}), of which 6.3% were vacant. The homeowner vacancy rate was 1.3% and the rental vacancy rate was 7.5%.

Racial composition as of the 2020 census
Race	Number	Percent
White	58,313	68.0%
Black or African American	5,046	5.9%
American Indian and Alaska Native	2,381	2.8%
Asian	2,804	3.3%
Native Hawaiian and Other Pacific Islander	641	0.7%
Some other race	7,900	9.2%
Two or more races	8,712	10.2%
Hispanic or Latino (of any race)	17,961	20.9%

The city has significant minority populations of West Africans, Somalis, Ethiopians, Vietnamese, Mexicans, and Guatemalans. This has been attributed to the many meat factories and manufacturing jobs in the area.

=== 2010 census ===
As of the 2010 census, there were 82,684 people, 31,571 households, and 20,144 families residing in the city. The population density was 1,441.74 inhabitants per square mile (556.7/km^{2}). There were 33,425 housing units at an average density of 582.82 per square mile (225.0/km^{2}). The racial makeup of the city was 80.60% White, 2.87% African American, 2.58% Native American, 2.73% Asian, 0.12% Pacific Islander, 7.38% from some other races and 3.72% from two or more races. Hispanic or Latino people of any race were 16.45% of the population.

There were 31,571 households, of which 34.3% had children under the age of 18 living with them, 44.2% were married couples living together, 13.8% had a female householder with no husband present, 5.9% had a male householder with no wife present, and 36.2% were non-families. 29.4% of all households were made up of individuals, and 11.1% had someone living alone who was 65 years of age or older. The average household size was 2.54 and the average family size was 3.14.

The median age in the city was 33.7 years. 26.6% of residents were under the age of 18; 11.4% were between the ages of 18 and 24; 25.6% were from 25 to 44; 24% were from 45 to 64, and 12.4% were 65 years of age or older. The gender makeup of the city was 49.2% male and 50.8% female.

=== 2000 census ===
As of the 2000 census, there were 85,013 people, 32,054 households, and 21,091 families residing in the city. The population density was 1,551.30 inhabitants per square mile (599.0/km^{2}). There were 33,816 housing units at an average density of 617.07 per square mile (238.3/km^{2}). The racial makeup of the city was 85.23% White, 2.41% African American, 1.95% Native American, 2.82% Asian, 0.04% Pacific Islander, 5.27% from some other races and 2.28% from two or more races. Hispanic or Latino people of any race were 10.89% of the population.

There were 32,054 households, of which 33.4% had children under the age of 18 living with them, 49.1% were married couples living together, 12.2% had a female householder with no husband present, and 34.2% were non-families. 27.7% of all households were made up of individuals, and 11.3% had someone living alone who was 65 years of age or older. The average household size was 2.57 and the average family size was 3.14.

Age spread: 27.1% under the age of 18, 11.0% from 18 to 24, 28.5% from 25 to 44, 20.2% from 45 to 64, and 13.3% who were 65 years of age or older. The median age was 33 years. For every 100 females, there were 95.4 males. For every 100 females age 18 and over, there were 92.2 males.

The median income for a household in the city was $37,429, and the median income for a family was $45,751. Males had a median income of $31,385 versus $22,470 for females. The per capita income for the city was $18,666. About 7.9% of families and 11.2% of the population were below the poverty line, including 15.0% of those under age 18 and 7.8% of those age 65 or over.

=== Metropolitan area ===
As of the 2020 census, the Sioux City metropolitan area had 144,334 residents in four counties. As defined by the Office of Management and Budget, the counties comprising the metropolitan area are (in descending order of population):

- Woodbury County, Iowa
- Dakota County, Nebraska
- Union County, South Dakota
- Dixon County, Nebraska

=== Crime ===
Sioux City has a crime rate that is 91% higher than the average for Iowa and 63% higher than the national average. The violent crime rate is 90% above the Iowa average and 49% higher than the national average, based on the FBI's uniform crime reports for 2020. According to the report, this represented a 12% decrease over the prior year.

== Economy ==
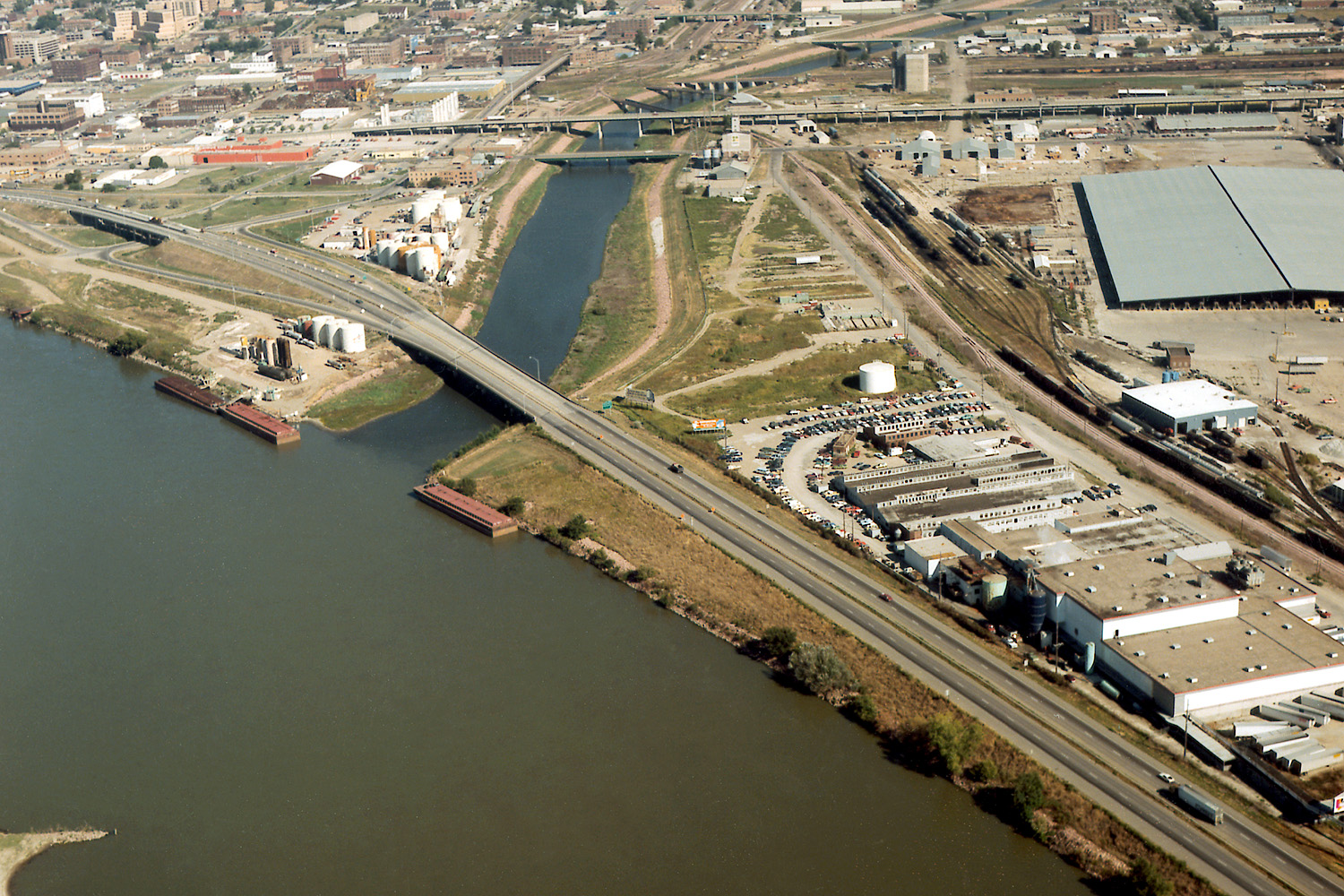
Confluence of Missouri and Floyd River in Sioux City

=== Top employers ===
Statistics from Sioux City's 2020 Annual Comprehensive Financial Report

Rank	Employer	Number of; employees	% of Total city; employment
1	Tyson Fresh Meats	4,500	10.77%
2	Seaboard Triumph Foods	2,400	5.74%
2	Sioux City Community School District	2,370	5.67%
4	Bomgaars	2,100	5.02%
5	Mercy Medical Center	1,562	3.74%
6	UnityPoint Health - St. Luke's	1,500	3.59%
7	Hy-Vee	1,023	2.45%
8	185th Air Refueling Wing	952	2.28%
9	City of Sioux City	878	2.10%
10	Western Iowa Tech Community College	700	---
	Totals	17,985	41.36%

== Arts and culture ==
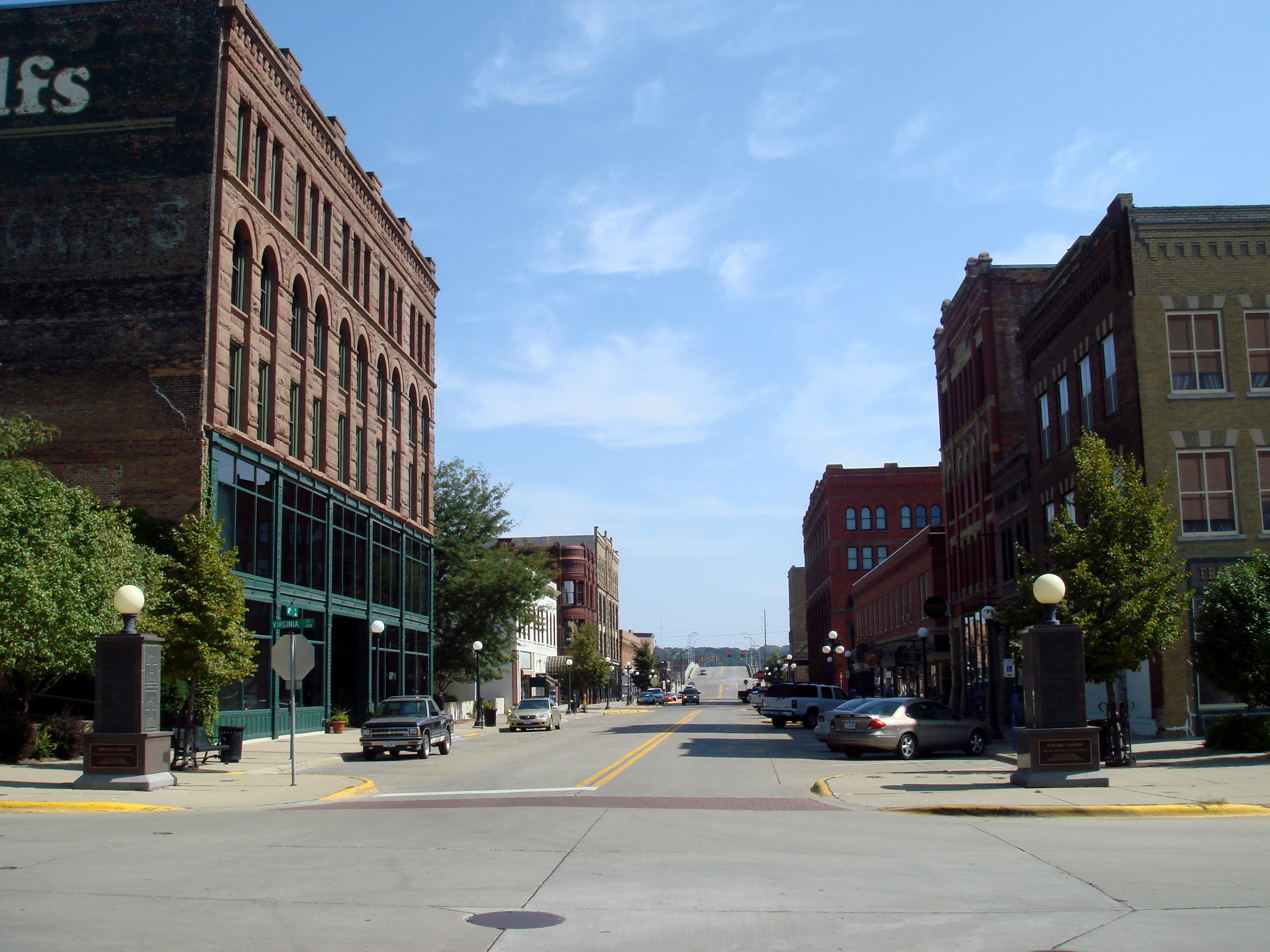
Fourth Street Historic District

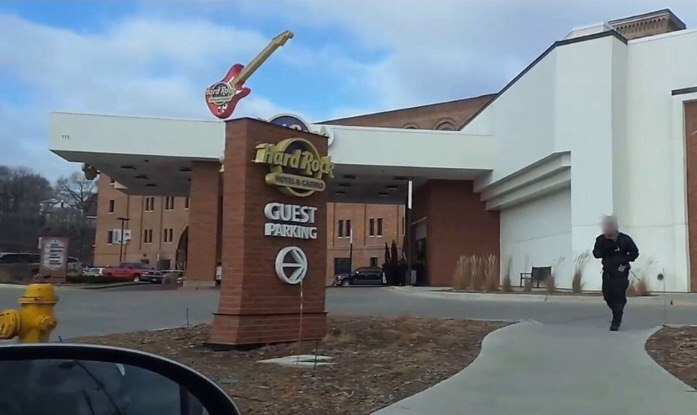
Hard Rock Hotel & Casino Sioux City

- The Sioux City Public Museum was originally located in a Northside neighborhood of fine Victorian mansions. The portico-and-gabled stone building was originally the home of the banker, John Peirce, and was built in 1890. The museum was recently relocated to downtown Sioux City, where it features Native American, pioneer, early Sioux City, and natural history exhibits.
- The Sioux City Art Center, located Downtown, was formed in 1938 as part of the WPA's support of the arts. The Art Center supports artists from Iowa and the greater Midwest. Also, the Center has a general program of acquisition of work by national and international artists, including important works by Thomas Hart Benton, Salvador Dalí, Käthe Kollwitz, Robert Motherwell, Claes Oldenburg, James Abbott McNeill Whistler, and Grant Wood.
- The Sergeant Floyd Monument commemorates the burial site of U.S. Army Sergeant Charles Floyd, the only man to die on the Lewis and Clark Expedition. It is a National Historic Landmark, with its prominent 100 ft (30 m) obelisk situated on 23 acres (9.3 ha) of parkland, high on a river bluff with a view of the Missouri River valley.
- Chris Larsen Park, informally known as "The Riverfront," includes the Anderson Dance Pavilion, the Sergeant Floyd Riverboat Museum and the Lewis and Clark Interpretive Center, opened in 2004. Missouri River development began in 2005 with the opening of the MLR Tyme Marina area, which included Bev's on the River, an upscale restaurant, that has now become a Crave.
- The Sioux City Symphony Orchestra (SCSO) was founded in 1915. The orchestra continues offering seven concerts within its annual season. Performances take place in the Orpheum Theatre in Sioux City, Iowa. Concert dates run from September to April each year. The SCSO has included several movie scores, with film, on its concert schedule. The SCSO's education programming reaches 9,000 to 12,000 young people via the partnership with Carnegie Hall's Link Up program with 100 orchestras in the country, programs for SCSO musicians to perform and teach music lessons in the schools, and performances in nursing homes, hospitals, and elsewhere.
- Milwaukee Railroad Shop is a 31.5 acres (12.7 ha) facility that is being renovated by the Siouxland Historical Railroad Association. It includes a 4-6-2 Pacific type steam locomotive, the Great Northern 1355, a model railroad exhibit, as well as multiple buildings including the roundhouse that are open to the public.
- Grandview Park is located north of the downtown area, up from Rose Hill, between The Northside and The Heights. The Municipal Bandshell is located in the park with Sunday evening municipal band concerts. The Saturday in the Park music festival began in 1991 and is held there annually on a weekend close to the Fourth of July holiday. Behind the bandshell is a rose garden with an arbor and trellises which has been a site for outdoor weddings, prom and other special occasion photographs, and for children to play during the Sunday evening band concerts and other events. Downtown is also home to the historic Orpheum Theatre. In 1927 when it was built, it was the largest theater in Iowa.
- Theatre is produced in Sioux City by two main entities, the Sioux City Community Theatre (SCCT), and LAMB Arts Regional Theatre. Each of these produce a full season of shows each year.

== Sports ==
- The Sioux City Bandits are an indoor football team that play in National Arena League. The Bandits play their home games at the Tyson Events Center.
- The Sioux City Explorers are an independent baseball team playing in the American Association. The Explorers play their home games at Lewis and Clark Park. They have been to the league playoffs five times.
- The Sioux City Musketeers are a junior hockey team based in Sioux City. They play in the United States Hockey League (USHL). They play their home games at the Tyson Events Center. Their first year of hockey was in 1972. The Musketeers have won the gold cup in the 1985–1986 season, the National Runner-up twice (1993–94, 1995–96), the Anderson Cup three times (1981–82, 1985–86, 2016–17), the Clark Cup four times (1981–82, 1985–86, 2001–02, 2021- 22), and Western Division Champions for the 2004–05, and 2016–17 seasons.
- The Sioux City Roller Dames were a non-profit roller derby corporation. The Roller Dames played all home games at the Longlines Family Recreation Center. The Dames hosted their first tournament in November 2008 and dissolved in December 2016.
- In the late 19th century, the Sioux City Cornhuskers played baseball in the Western League before relocating. After a five-year stint in St. Paul, Minnesota as the St. Paul Saints, the league changed its name to the American League, and the team moved to Chicago, where it continues today as the Chicago White Sox.
- The Sioux City Stampede play amateur outdoor football in the Midwest Football Alliance.
- The Sioux City Swine plays rugby union.
- Siouxland United FC nicknamed "The Outlaws" are a semi-professional soccer team that currently compete in the National Premier Soccer League and are member of the North Conference. Founded in 2023, the Outlaws play their home matches at Bishop Heelan Catholic High School's Memorial Field.The club was regular season North Conference champions in 2025.
- Sioux City Sol is a semi-professional women's soccer team that competes in the Women's Premier Soccer League Division II. Founded in 2025, they play their home matches at Elwood Olsen Stadium on the campus of Morningside University.

== Parks and recreation ==
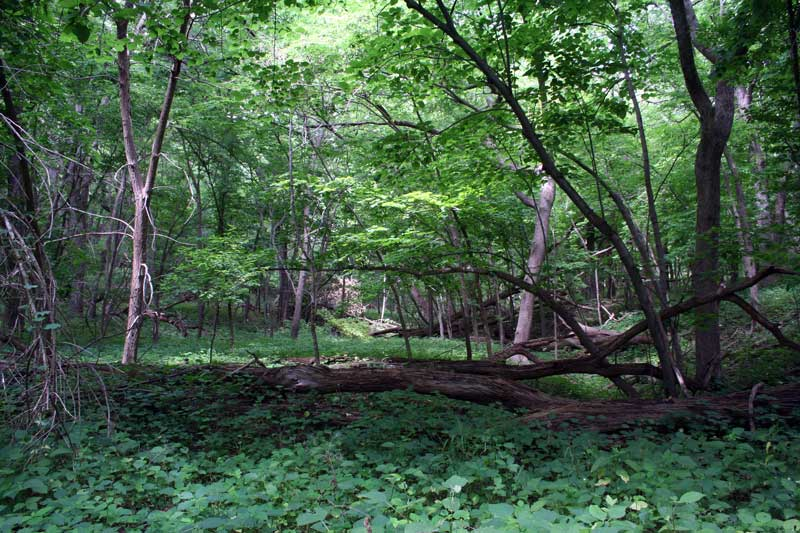
Stone State Park

- Stone State Park is in the northwest corner of the city, overlooking the South Dakota/Iowa border. Stone Park is near the northernmost extent of the Loess Hills, and is at the transition from clay bluffs and prairie to sedimentary rock hills and bur oak forest along the Iowa side of the Big Sioux River. The park is used by picnickers, day hikers, and for mountain biking.
- Dorothy Pecaut Nature Center is a destination nature preserve for Woodbury County, and is located within the boundaries of Stone State Park. The butterfly garden is unique to the area; wild turkeys and white-tail deer are commonly sighted from the well-marked trails.
- Downtown entertainment venues include the Hard Rock Hotel & Casino Sioux City, the 10,000-seat Tyson Events Center/ Fleet Farm Arena, Sioux City Orpheum Theatre, Promenade Cinema 14 and the Anderson Dance Pavilion which overlooks the Missouri River.
- Pulaski Park is named for the Polish General Kazimierz Pułaski, who fought in the American Revolution. This park features baseball diamond facilities, and is located in western Morningside along old U.S. Highway 75 (South Lewis Blvd.). It is largely built on the filled lakebed of Half Moon Lake, which was originally created in the 1890s by the excavation of fill dirt to build the approaches for the iron railroad bridge spanning the Missouri near the stockyards. The neighborhood on the bluff overlooking the park was historically settled by Lithuanian and Polish immigrants, many of whom worked in the meatpacking industry during the early 20th century.
- Latham Park is located in a residential area of Morningside, and is the only privately owned and maintained open-to-the-public park within the city limits. It was left in trust in 1937 under the terms of Clara Latham's will; her family had built the house on 1-acre (4,000 m^{2}) of ground in 1915. The house and grounds are currently being restored by the Friends of Latham Park.
- First Bride's Grave is tucked in a corner pocket of South Ravine Park, lies a series of paths, trails, and steps leading to the grave of the First Bride of Sioux City, Rosalie Menard. She was the first bride of a non-Native American to be wed in Sioux City, Iowa, thus receiving her title.
- War Eagle Park is named for the Yankton Sioux chief Wambdi Okicize (d. 1851) who befriended early settlers. A monument overlooks the confluence of the Big Sioux and Missouri Rivers. The sculpture represents the chief in his role as a leader and peacemaker, wearing the eagle feather bonnet and holding the ceremonial pipe.
- Riverside Park is located on the banks of the Big Sioux River. One of the oldest recreational areas of the city, it is home to the Sioux City Boat Club and Sioux City Community Theater. The park is on land that once belonged to the first white settler in the area, Théophile Bruguier; his original cabin is preserved in the park.
- Bacon Creek Park is located northeast of Morningside and features a scenic walking trail, dog park, picnic shelters, and playground equipment.

Golf courses, city parks, and aquatics: Sioux City is also home to several municipal public golf courses, including Floyd Park in Morningside, Green Valley near the Southern Hills, Sun Valley on the northern West Side, and Hidden Acres in nearby Plymouth County. Sioux City also has a number of private golf clubs, including Sioux City Country Club, and Whispering Creek Golf Club. The city has over 1,132 acres (5 km^{2}) of public parkland located at 53 locations, including the riverfront and many miles of recreation trails. Five public swimming pools/aquatics centers are located within Sioux City neighborhoods.

== Education ==
=== Public schools ===
The Sioux City Community School District served 14,569 students in the 2018–2019 school year; there are three public high schools West High School, North High School, East High School (grades 9-12), three public Middle Schools, West Middle, North Middle, and East Middle (grades 6-8), and 19 Elementary Schools (grades K-5).

Because of sprawl, districts around Sioux City continue to grow at dramatic rates. South Sioux City, Hinton, North Sioux City, Lawton, Bronson, Elk Point, Jefferson, Vermillion, Le Mars, Hawarden, Akron, Westfield, Ponca, Sergeant Bluff, Wayne, Sioux Center, along with other school districts that serve many metro-area students.

=== Private schools ===
Bishop Heelan Catholic Schools is a centralized private Catholic School System that includes six schools: They teach preschool through twelfth grade.

Siouxland Christian School educates grades pre-K-12 and began in 1959.

St. Paul Lutheran School offers K-5 schooling.

=== Advanced education ===
Sioux City is home to Briar Cliff University, Morningside University, Western Iowa Tech Community College, St. Luke's College of Nursing, and the Bellevue University outreach center.

== Media ==
=== Television stations ===
- KTIV, Channel 4, NBC affiliate (4.1); CW affiliate (4.2); MeTV affiliate (4.3); Court TV affiliate (4.4); Ion Television affiliate (4.5); Circle affiliate (4.6)
- KCAU-TV, Channel 9, ABC affiliate (9.1); Ion Mystery affiliate (9.2); Laff affiliate (9.3); Bounce TV affiliate (9.4)
- KMEG, Channel 14, Dabl affiliate (14.1); Charge! (TV network) affiliate (14.2); Comet affiliate (14.3); Stadium affiliate (14.4)
- KSIN, Channel 27, an Iowa PBS station: digital channels are PBS (27.1), PBS Kids (27.2), World Channel (27.3), and Create (27.4)
- KPTH, Channel 44, Fox affiliate (44.1); TBD affiliate and MyNetworkTV affiliate (44.2); CBS affiliate (44.3)

=== Radio stations ===
==== FM stations ====
- KFHC-FM, 88.1, Catholic radio featuring EWTN programming.
- KWIT, 90.3, National Public Radio owned by Western Iowa Tech Community College.
- KMSC, 92.9, college radio station operated by Morningside University.
- KGLI, 95.5, "KG95", adult contemporary.
- KSEZ, 97.9, "Z98", active rock.
- KKMA, 99.5, "Classic Rock 99.5", plays classic rock.
- KKYY, 101.3, "Y101.3", country music.
- KQNU, 102.3, ("Q 102.3"), adult hits.
- KTFC, 103.3, Religious radio broadcasting the Bott Radio Network.
- KSUX, 105.7, "The SuperPig, K-Sioux 105.7", country music.
- KSFT-FM, 107.1, "107.1 KISS FM", top 40.

==== AM stations ====
- KMNS, 620, sports talk radio.
- KSCJ, 1360, talk radio.
- KWSL, 1470, Spanish music.

=== Print ===
- Sioux City Journal, daily newspaper serving greater Sioux City area, including Iowa, Nebraska and South Dakota.
- Dakota County Star, weekly newspaper serving northeast Nebraska.
- Sioux City Hispanos Unidos, bi-weekly Spanish readers paper.
- The Weekender, weekly arts and entertainment magazine serving the Sioux City metro area east into Western Iowa and north to the South Dakota border.
- Siouxland Magazine, quarterly magazine with community/lifestyle features.

== Infrastructure ==
=== Transportation ===
==== Highways ====
- Interstate 29.
- Interstate 129 is a bypass to surrounding suburbs.
- Interstate 129.
- U.S. Route 20.

==== Public transportation ====
Sioux City Transit, the local public transit organization, operates several bus lines within the city. Buses transfer downtown in the Martin Luther King Jr. Transportation Center at 505 Nebraska Street. The Sioux City Paratransit serves members of the community who would otherwise not be able to travel by providing door to door service.

==== Air ====
The city is served by Sioux Gateway Airport (SUX) 6 mi (9.7 km) to its south where United Airlines' affiliate SkyWest Airlines has announced it plans to discontinue the one flight per day each to Chicago and Denver it currently offers. As those flights are federally subsidized under the Essential Air Service program, SkyWest is required to continue those flights until a replacement is found.

FBO and jet charter services are currently offered by Ascension FBO Network.

==== Other transportation ====
Jefferson Lines runs long-distance bus routes to Sioux City. Non-Transfer destinations include Winnipeg, Kansas City, Minneapolis, and Omaha.

Sioux City also has several private taxi companies that operate within the city.

There is no established water or rail passenger transportation in the area. The last passenger train was the Illinois Central's Hawkeye, a daily train to Chicago via Waterloo, Dubuque and Rockford, discontinued in 1971.

Big Soo Terminal offers barge transportation.

== Notable people ==
- John W. Aldridge, born in Sioux City, grew up in Tennessee, literary critic, author
- Jim Aton, virtuoso jazz bassist, pianist, vocalist and composer with Billie Holiday, Bill Evans, Anita O'Day, others
- Art Babbitt (1907–1992), an American animator, best known for his work at Walt Disney Animation Studios
- Dave Bancroft (1891–1972), an MLB shortstop and manager and member of the Baseball Hall of Fame
- Emmett Barrett, football player
- Joe Bisenius, Philadelphia Phillies relief pitcher, graduate of Bishop Heelan Catholic High School
- Tommy Bolin, born in Sioux City, guitarist, member of Deep Purple and the James Gang
- Bread of Stone, American contemporary Christian music and pop rock band formed in 2004
- Sally Brent, American distance runner and marathon winner
- Chase Bromstedt, soccer player
- Mildred Brown, African-American journalist, worked in Iowa as teacher
- Macdonald Carey, actor (Days of Our Lives)
- Paul B. Carpenter, politician
- Matt Chatham, NFL linebacker, born in Newton, Iowa, graduate of North High School
- Eli Chesen, psychiatrist and writer
- Ron Clements, Disney animator, director
- Vern Clark, former Chief of Naval Operations (CNO) in the United States Navy
- Carroll Edward Cole, serial killer
- Ryan Cownie, stand-up comedian, born in Sioux City
- Tyler Cropley, Major League Baseball catcher
- Dave Croston (1963– ), former NFL player for Green Bay Packers
- Brigadier General George E. "Bud" Day, U.S. Air Force, Vietnam POW, recipient of the Medal of Honor
- Leo Delperdang, born in Sioux City. Member of Kansas House of Representatives
- W. Edwards Deming, quality-control expert, helped improve Japan's quality control
- Brittni Donaldson (born 1993), current assistant coach with the Atlanta Hawks
- Todd Doxzon, football player
- Sharon Farrell (1940–2023), actress (birth name Sharon Forsmoe)
- Tommy Lee Farmer, criminal, first person in US convicted under Three-strikes law
- Vergilius Ferm (1896–1974), philosopher, historian, and Compton Professor of Philosophy at the College of Wooster
- Susan Fessenden (1840–1932), founder/president, Sioux City YWCA; president, Sioux City WCTU
- Zeron Flemister, NFL tight end 2000–2005
- Bruce Forbes, author, professor of Religious Studies Morningside College
- For Today, a Christian metal band signed to Razor & Tie Records
- Esther and Pauline Friedman, better known as Ann Landers and Abigail Van Buren, respectively; advice columnists
- Lila-Gene George (1918–2017), composer and pianist
- Peggy Gilbert, jazz saxophonist and bandleader
- Dan Goldie, tennis player, winner of two ATP singles titles
- Fred Grandy, television actor, U.S. congressman, CEO of Goodwill, and radio personality
- Dick Green, former MLB second baseman with Kansas City and Oakland Athletics, raised in South Dakota
- William L. Harding (1877–1934), born in Sibley, the 22nd Governor of Iowa 1917–1921
- John Harty, NFL defensive end 1981–1986
- Matthew C. Harrison, 13th president of the Lutheran Church–Missouri Synod
- Godfrey Hattenbach, "father" of the Sioux City Jewish community
- Tim Hauff, jazz bassist, performed with Herbie Hancock, Wayne Shoter, Bruce Forman, others
- Alan J. Heeger, physicist awarded Nobel Prize in Chemistry (2000)
- Alan Hurwitz, born in Sioux City, 10th president of Gallaudet University
- Kirk Hinrich, professional basketball player
- J.B.E. Hittle, author and historian
- Harry Hopkins, Secretary of Commerce, advisor to FDR during World War II
- Shelby Houlihan competed in the 5000m in the 2016 Rio Olympics
- Fred Jackson, football player attended Coe in Cedar Rapids
- Art Johnson, racing driver
- Jacqui Kalin (born 1989), American-Israeli professional basketball player
- Ryan Kisor, jazz trumpeter
- Judy Kimball, LPGA champion golfer, member of Iowa Sports Hall of Fame
- Roy L. Kline, Brigadier general, USMC and Naval aviator
- George Koval (1913–2006), Soviet atomic spy and only Soviet agent to infiltrate the Manhattan Project
- Jerry Lacy, stage, film, soap opera, and television actor
- Kian Lawley, YouTuber, influencer, and actor
- Bill Lewis, NFL center from 1986–93
- Dave Loebsack, U.S. congressman for Iowa's 2nd congressional district
- Jerry Mathers, actor, played Beaver Cleaver on TV's Leave It to Beaver
- Daniel Matousek, lead singer and guitarist for The Velaires
- Cameron McAdoo, professional Motocross and Supercross racer
- Mick McGinty, artist and illustrator
- Max McGraw, founder of McGraw-Edison and Centel
- Al McIntosh, newspaper editor whose columns are featured in Ken Burns' The War
- John Melcher, U.S. Senator from Montana from 1977 to 1989
- Iris Meredith, actress
- Oscar Micheaux, the first African American filmmaker in America
- Big Miller (Clarence Horatius Miller), jazz and blues singer and double bassist
- Constance Moore, singer and actress
- Marshall F. Moore, 7th Governor of Washington Territory
- John Mosher, jazz bassist and composer
- John Osborn, tenor
- Frances Rafferty, film and television actress (December Bride)
- Max Rafferty, California State Superintendent of Public Instruction from 1963 to 1971
- John Redwine, Iowa state senator and physician, lived in Sioux Falls
- Harriett Rinaldo, social worker
- Ann Royer, painter, sculptor
- Justin Sandy, NFL safety from 2004–2008
- Laurens Shull, All-American football player killed in France during World War I
- Edward J. Sperling, born in Slutsk, Belarus, Jewish writer and humorist
- Paul Splittorff, former Major League Baseball pitcher, attended college in Sioux City
- Doris June Struble, pianist, singer, and dramatic reader
- Morgan Taylor, athlete, set 400-meter hurdles Olympic record while winning gold medal in 1924
- Kyle Thousand, sports agent
- Frank Van Hoven, vaudeville magician and comic entertainer
- Gertrude Van Wagenen, Yale University, pioneer in reproductive biology, primate research
- Ted Waitt, co-founder of Gateway, Inc.
- Brian Wansink, professor, discredited researcher, and author
- Pierre Watkin, radio, films and TV actor
- Tony Watson, former MLB all star pitcher for the Pittsburgh Pirates
- Kathleen Weaver, writer and editor
- Don Wengert, MLB pitcher from 1995 to 2001
- Paul Zaeske, football player
- R. Timothy Ziemer, Navy admiral, disease expert on the United States National Security Council

== Sister cities ==
- Lake Charles, Louisiana (since 1995)
- Yamanashi, Yamanashi Prefecture, Japan (since 2003)
- Gjilan, Kosovo (since 2020)

== See also ==
- Mayors of Sioux City, Iowa, is a list of the known mayors of Sioux City, Iowa
- Siouxland, the vernacular region in which Sioux City, Iowa, is located
