= KSCJ =

- Sioux City, Iowa; United States
- Frequency: 1360 kHz
- Branding: Talk Radio 1360

Programming
- Format: News/talk
- Affiliations: Fox News Radio; Premiere Networks; Radio America; Westwood One; Iowa Hawkeyes; Kansas City Chiefs; Sioux City Explorers

Ownership
- Owner: Powell Broadcasting; (KSUX/KSCJ Radio Broadcasting Co.)
- Sister stations: KSUX; KLEM; KKYY; KQNU; KKMA

History
- First air date: April 4, 1927 (98 years ago)
- Call sign meaning: Sioux City Journal (founding owners)

Technical information
- Licensing authority: FCC
- Facility ID: 21691
- Class: B
- Power: 5,000 watts
- Transmitter coordinates: 42°33′24″N 96°20′13.1″W
- Translator: 94.9 K235CA (Sioux City)

Links
- Public license information: Public file; LMS
- Webcast: Listen live
- Website: kscj.com

KSCJ (1360 AM, "Talk Radio 1360") is a radio station licensed to serve Sioux City, Iowa, United States. The station is owned by Powell Broadcasting and licensed to KSUX/KSCJ Radio Broadcasting Co. It airs a news/talk radio format. KSCJ is one of the oldest radio stations in Iowa, having officially signed on the air on April 4, 1927.

== Programming ==
Three locally produced shows air every weekday: "Good Morning Siouxland", with co-hosts Justin Barker and Josie Cooper; "Open Line with Charlie Stone"; and "Drivetime Live" with Mark Hahn. "Nostalgia Theater", with co-hosts Larry Fuller and Don Miller, airs on Saturdays. The Saturday morning lineup also features locally-produced programs dealing with the mental health, finances, positive local news, and gardening.

"Having Read That with Brian Vakulskas" airs at 7:40 every Tuesday morning. The segment features interview with authors about their books. Although local authors have appeared from time-to-time, the segment regularly features authors whose works have populated the New York Times Best Seller list, such as David Baldacci, Mary Higgins Clark, Lisa Scottoline, Joseph Finder, and John Sandford. Various well-known television hosts have also appeared, including Bret Baier and Ainsley Earhardt of Fox News and Chris Matthews of MSNBC.

During the fall and winter months, the station broadcasts local high school football and basketball games. Justin Barker provides the play-by-play. The halftime shows for high school athletics broadcasts frequently feature well-known celebrities. Past guests include Tony Dow, Scott Ferrall, and "Blue Lou" Marini.

Every April, "Open Line" broadcasts for a week live from Washington, D.C. The broadcasts originate from various studios in the Capitol Hill area of the city, including the studios at the office of Federation for Immigration Reform (FAIR), located at 25 Massachusetts Avenue NW. In-studio guests appear on the program, including members of the United States Senate and House of Representatives, as well as other government officials. Past guests have also included D.C.-based journalists, comedians, government officials, museum curators, and policy experts from think tanks.

The station provides national news updates at the top of every hour from Fox News Radio. During daytime hours, the national news is followed up with local headlines with news director Woody Gottburg or other members of the news department. Gottburg, a former announcer for the Sioux City Musketeers, owns a large collection of hockey memorabilia. Gottburg is also a mainstay at the local courthouse on election night, providing live updates of election returns and frequently hosts legislative forums with local statehouse candidates.

At various times throughout the year, KSCJ conducts its very popular "Treasure Hunt". A staff member hides a "treasure" somewhere within the city limits of Sioux City, always on public property. Each weekday during the hunt, the on-air talent reveal a new clue to the listening audience. The hidden treasure is actually a piece of paper directing the finder to bring it to the KSCJ offices, to be exchanged for a cash prize. Local businesses sponsor the cash prizes.

KSCJ broadcasts all Sioux City Explorers baseball games. The station is also the local affiliate for Iowa Hawkeyes football and men's basketball, the Kansas City Chiefs, and various sports broadcasts presented by Westwood One.

Several times throughout the year, the station holds the "KSCJ Radio Auction" live on the air. Listeners are encouraged to call in and bid on gift certificates from local businesses, most of which sell for just over half the actual value.

One of the most popular features on "Good Morning Siouxland" is a daily segment called, "Fact or B.S." The co-hosts will read a statement and listeners will call in and identify the statement as either "fact" or "B.S." A correct answer wins the caller a gift certificate to a local eatery. Another popular segment is "Movie Trivia", where the co-hosts will play a short sound clip from a movie and the listeners call in and identify the movie title. The winner receives passes to a local movie theater and a box of microwave Jolly Time Popcorn.

KSCJ has had very popular conservative pundits on air over the years, including Rush Limbaugh, Sean Hannity, and Jim Bohannon. The Clay Travis and Buck Sexton Show and The Dana Show now air on the station, as well as shows hosted by Bill O'Reilly, Dave Ramsey, and Kim Komando, along with the syndicated Red Eye Radio and First Light.

On Sunday mornings, the station airs religious programming.

== History ==
KSCJ started as a local news, sports and weather station in Sioux City, Iowa, on April 4, 1927, originally the broadcasting unit for the Sioux City Journal, owned and operated by the Perkins Brothers Broadcasting Company. The station was subsequently purchased by Flagship Communications Corporation. It is now owned by Powell Broadcasting, along with sister stations KSUX, Y 101.3, Q102, and Classic Rock 99.5. KLEM in nearby LeMars, Iowa, is another Powell-owned station.

The station's original studios were located at 413 Douglas Street in Sioux City. By the 1950s, the station had moved its operations to 520 Nebraska Street. They are now located at 2000 Indian Hills Drive.

The first major local event covered by KSCJ was the August 27, 1927 visit to Sioux City by aviator Charles Lindbergh, following his historic solo flight across the Atlantic Ocean.

In August 1932, while Northwest Iowa (including Sioux City) became the focal point of the nation's agricultural discontent, KSCJ covered the "Farmer's Holiday" or "Milk War" protests of low farm prices and farm foreclosures throughout the area.

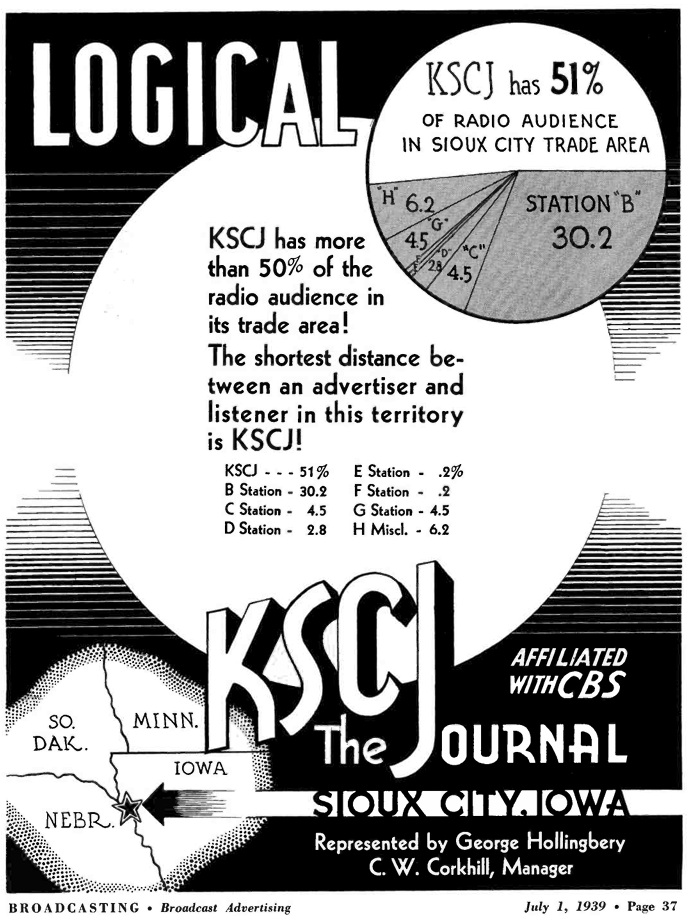
1939 station advertisement.

In July 1944, KSCJ's Sunday night programming included Drew Pearson, Quiz Kids, Walter Winchell, Sammy Kaye, Jimmie Fidler, and The Life of Riley starring William Bendix.

In the 1950s, Andy Woolfries was a news reporter at KSCJ.

On February 8, 1951, KSCJ covered the events surrounding the Combination Bridge (linking Sioux City and South Sioux City, Nebraska) becoming toll-free.

From July 25, 1954, through August 1, 1954, KSCJ covered the events celebrating the Sioux City Centennial.

On September 11, 1960, KSCJ covered the opening of the Sioux City Public Museum at the Peirce Mansion.

For a brief period during the 1960s as a teenager, Fred Grandy, a native of Sioux City, interned at KSCJ when several members of the station's staff had been drafted to serve in the Vietnam War. Grandy eventually pursued an acting career and gained notoriety when he portrayed Gopher Smith on ABC-TV's The Love Boat. He appeared in 246 episodes over the show's 9 seasons and, in 1986, was elected to Congress, representing Iowa's sixth congressional district. Of his decision to leave Hollywood, return to Sioux City, and run for Congress, Grandy said, "In 1986 I literally walked off a ship, traded my white shorts for long pants and went into grain elevators asking people to vote for me." He did not seek re-election in 1994.

In 1972, KSCJ covered the opening of three new high schools for the fall term, as well as the merger of the former Lutheran and Methodists hospitals culminating with the opening of St. Luke's Medical Center.

On December 22, 1976, KSCJ covered the dedication of the Sergeant Floyd Memorial Bridge, linking Iowa and Nebraska. On the same day, groundbreaking ceremonies were held for the Highway 77/20 Combination Bridge replacement.

As part of the celebration of KSCJ's 50th Anniversary in 1977, CBS News released an LP record entitled, "KSCJ: The Sound of 50 Years".

From 1979 until 2004, Sam Seldon was the KSCJ chief engineer. His oral history was preserved by the Archives of Iowa Broadcasting Oral History Project. Seldon died in 2005. His collection of vintage radios were displayed at the Sioux City Public Museum in 2014.

Since its debut, the news department has covered every major event in Sioux City, including the 1953 flood of the Floyd River, the 1990 Perry Creek flood, the 1978 closing of the Zenith assembly plant, the 1993 closing of the General Motors AC Rochester division plant, the 2001 Adam Moss homicides, the 2010 closing of the John Morrell & Co. packing plant, the 2012 closing of the Delta Air Lines call center, the 2012 and 2013 closing of both Black Bear Diner locations, the 2015 settlement of a sexual harassment lawsuit against former City of Sioux City Manager Paul Eckert, the 2016 closing of the CenturyLink call center, and the 1989 crash of United Airlines Flight 232 (as well as the 1991 filming of the made-for-TV movie, Crash Landing: The Rescue of Flight 232). Nearly every U.S. presidential candidate finds their way to the KSCJ airwaves to be interviewed in the months leading up to the Iowa caucuses. State, regional, and local candidates are always frequent guests on the station's various local programs.

In the early 1990s, Col. Bud Day appeared live in-studio during an episode of "Open Line with Randy Renshaw". Day, a native of Sioux City and a retired United States Air Force colonel, is the only person to be awarded both the Medal of Honor and the Air Force Cross. He died in 2013 as the most decorated United States Military Officer since Douglas MacArthur.

In 2005, Dennis Bullock was named general manager of Powell Broadcasting's Sioux City operations. From 2012 until 2013, Bullock served a one-year term as chair of the Siouxland Chamber of Commerce Board of Directors.

On December 15, 2011, Sean Hannity broadcast his nationally-syndicated radio program from the KSCJ studios. Hannity was in Sioux City that day to cover the Republican Primary Presidential Debate for the Fox News Channel, which was held at the Sioux City Convention Center.

On September 24, 2013, KSCJ general sales manager Dave Grosenheider performed the National Anthem at the Siouxland Chamber of Commerce Annual Dinner in Downtown Sioux City.

In 2014, "Open Line" host Charlie Stone served as a panelist during the televised Iowa gubernatorial debate held in Sioux City.

In April 2017, KSCJ celebrated its 90th anniversary. In December 2017, Powell Broadcasting purchased a white maltese dog, which it named Sammy (in honor of Sam Seldon), to be auctioned off at the 82nd Annual Little Yellow Dog Auction. Proceeds from the auction benefit the Sioux City Journal's Goodfellow Charities, which provides toys to needy children at Christmastime. KSCJ broadcasts the auction live every year on the second Saturday in December, drawing a huge broadcast audience and online listeners worldwide.

Overnight between April 22 and 23, 2017, "Having Read That with Brian Vakulskas" segment producer Jonathan Wiesler was the victim of a homicide in Iowa City, Iowa. Wieseler was found shot to death at his bail bonds office. Curtis Cortez Jones was charged with first degree murder in Wieseler's death. Mr. Jones was convicted of first degree murder on January 23, 2019. On March 26, 2019, he received a mandatory sentence of life in prison without the possibility of parole. On April 25, 2017, Vakulskas paid tribute to Wieseler at the conclusion of a "Having Read That" interview with David Baldacci, one of Wieseler's favorite authors.

On April 25, 2017, longtime "Open Line" host and news director Randy Renshaw died at the age of 66. Renshaw retired from KSCJ in 2012. A fan of Chicago, his funeral featured the band's 1977 hit, "If You Leave Me Now". Shortly before Renshaw's retirement, he recorded a video as he recounted his memories of working at KSCJ.

On December 22, 2017, during the third hour of "Open Line with Charlie Stone", the station debuted an newly produced "old-time" radio play, "A KSCJ Christmas Carol". The script was written by Brian & Dan Vakulskas and features the voice talents of several KSCJ on-air personalities.

On May 1, 2018, "Open Line with Charlie Stone" was broadcast on-location from the rotunda of the Woodbury County Courthouse in downtown Sioux City. The broadcast marked the beginning of the week-long celebration of the building's 100th anniversary. Stone was joined on the air by county-level politicians, as well as District Judge Duane Hoffmeyer.

In mid-2018, Tom Beightol announced his retirement from KSCJ after co-hosting "Good Morning Siouxland" for several years.

On February 28, 2019, Charlie Stone accidentally dropped his mobile phone outside the Sioux City Convention Center while walking into the building for an appearance at the 62nd Annual Siouxland Home Show. The phone was found by Sioux Cityans Orville and Diane Kenowith. Not knowing its owner, the couple waited for someone to call the phone. Eventually, the phone rang. The caller was Stone's wife (who Stone affectionately refers to on the air as "Precious Moments"). Diane answered and, upon learning she was speaking to Stone's wife, said, "Is this Precious Moments?" The Kenowiths turned Stone's phone over to general manager Dennis Bullock at the convention center, who later returned it to a relieved Stone. The following day, Stone heavily praised the Kenowiths on the air for their benevolence.
