= Merophyas immersana =

Scientific classification
- Kingdom: Animalia
- Phylum: Arthropoda
- Class: Insecta
- Order: Lepidoptera
- Family: Tortricidae
- Genus: Merophyas
- Species: M. immersana

Binomial name
- Merophyas immersana (Walker, 1863)

Synonyms
- Paedisca immersana Walker, 1863; Dichelia argillosana Meyrick, 1881; Tortrix trygodana Meyrick, 1881

Species of moth

Merophyas immersana is a species of moth of the family Tortricidae. It is found in Australia, where it has been recorded from New South Wales, Victoria and Tasmania. The habitat consists of open areas, including pastures.

The wingspan is about 14 mm.

The larvae feed on Trifolium (including Trifolium repens), Lupinus and Malva species.
