= Sara Diamond =

Sara Diamond may refer to:

- Sara Diamond (academic administrator) (born 1954), Canadian artist and former university president
- Sara Diamond (singer) (born 1995), Canadian singer/songwriter
- Sara Diamond (sociologist) (born 1958), American writer, sociologist and attorney

== See also ==
- Sarah E. Diamond (living), American biologist
- Diamond (surname)
