= List of Trinity Western University people =

This is a list of people associated with Trinity Western University in Vancouver, British Columbia.

- Jeffrey Ansloos, Indigenous scholar, psychologist and children’s author
- Carolyn Arends, musician, songwriter, and author
- Jonathan Auxier, children's author
- Paul Chamberlain, professor of philosophy at Trinity Western
- Roger Cross, television and screen actor
- Deborah Grey, former Member of Parliament, former acting Leader of the Official Opposition (Canada)
- Bernie Herms, musician, producer, and composer (husband of Natalie Grant)
- Paul Janz, philosophy professor, former international musician
- Brie King, professional volleyball player and musician.
- Damien C. Kurek, Member of Parliament, Battle River-Crowfoot
- Dane Lloyd, Infantry Officer, Member of Parliament, Sturgeon River-Parkland
- Grant McNally, former Member of Parliament
- Randal Rauser, author, associate professor at Taylor College and Seminary
- Chaim Schalk, Olympic and professional beach volleyball player
- Chuck Strahl, former Member of Parliament, Minister of Indian and Northern Affairs Canada
- Mark Strahl, Member of Parliament
- Tara Teng, abolitionist and beauty pageant winner
- Ryan Walter, former NHL player, former assistant coach of the Vancouver Canucks; now motivational speaker, author and leadership expert
- Mark Warawa, Member of Parliament, former Parliamentary Secretary
- Phillip H. Wiebe, professor of philosophy and religious studies at Trinity Western
- Bob Zimmer, Member of Parliament, Prince George-Peace River-Northern Rockies
