= Global Urban Evolution Project =

Project studying urban evolution

External videos
- Global Urban Evolution project findings, University of Toronto Mississauga

The Global Urban Evolution Project is an international collaborative project which was started by Marc T. J. Johnson at the Centre for Urban Environments of the University of Toronto Mississauga (UTM). It includes partners from at least 5 continents, 26 countries, and 160 cities. As a field study of evolution, and as a global study of the effects of urbanization on evolution, its scale is unprecedented. It has been described as "the best replicated test of parallel evolution, on the largest scale ever attempted".

The project uses white clover as a model organism for studying global urbanization and urban evolution. White clover was chosen because it already grew in most cities worldwide. It examines the plant's production of hydrogen cyanide (HCN) in urban and more rural environments ("urban-rural clines"). Hydrogen cyanide deters herbivores and increases clover's tolerance for water stress.

The project has demonstrated that urban environments are altering the ways in which plants evolve locally, and that similar changes are occurring globally, a demonstration of parallel evolution. It enables researchers to better understand the nature of urban environments, the adaptive capacity of species, and their ability to deal with rapid global environmental changes.

== Project history ==
In 2018, lead scientist Marc Johnson announced the project by tweeting "We are seeking collaborators to participate in the Global Urban Evolution (GLUE) project, a global study that seeks to understand whether urbanization drives parallel evolution in cities around the world." Co-leaders of the project were Rob Ness and PhD student James Santangelo, all three at University of Toronto Mississauga.

The resulting project has involved 287 scientists and over 550 people at various academic levels worldwide. It is an example of inclusive science with a team including equal numbers of women and men from around the world. Sonja Knapp categorizes it as an experimental network and a global experiment with a shared methodology.

== Results ==
The project has collected over 110,000 clover samples and sequenced over 2,500 clover genomes, creating a huge dataset for the study of the species around the globe.

Analyzing urban-rural clines, scientists found that cyanide production tended to increase with distance from the center of cities, suggesting that clover populations were adapting to factors commonly found in urban centers worldwide. Possible factors could include temperature (freezing is related to cyanide content), herbivory pressures, and drought stress. The research suggests that the downtowns of cities such as Boston may more closely resemble far-flung cities such as Beijing as clover habitats than they resemble rural areas located nearby.
