= School of Cities =

Research centre at the University of Toronto, Canada

- Established: July 1, 2018
- Research type: Extra-departmental unit
- Director: Karen Chapple
- Location: Toronto, Ontario, Canada; 43°39′39″N 79°23′47″W
- Operating agency: University of Toronto Faculty of Arts and Science
- Website: schoolofcities.utoronto.ca

The School of Cities is a research centre dedicated to urban study and education at the University of Toronto. The centre is an extra-departmental unit (EDU) composed of faculty from the university's three campuses and visiting professors from other institutions, with the goal of consolidating urban-focused academics from various divisions, such as Engineering, Architecture, and Public Health.

The centre is directed by Karen Chapple, a professor of urban planning in the Department of Geography and Planning who also holds the Carmel P. Friesen Chair in Urban Studies at the University of California, Berkeley. It is based in the Myhal Centre for Engineering Innovation and Entrepreneurship on the St. George campus in downtown Toronto, Ontario, Canada.

== Research ==
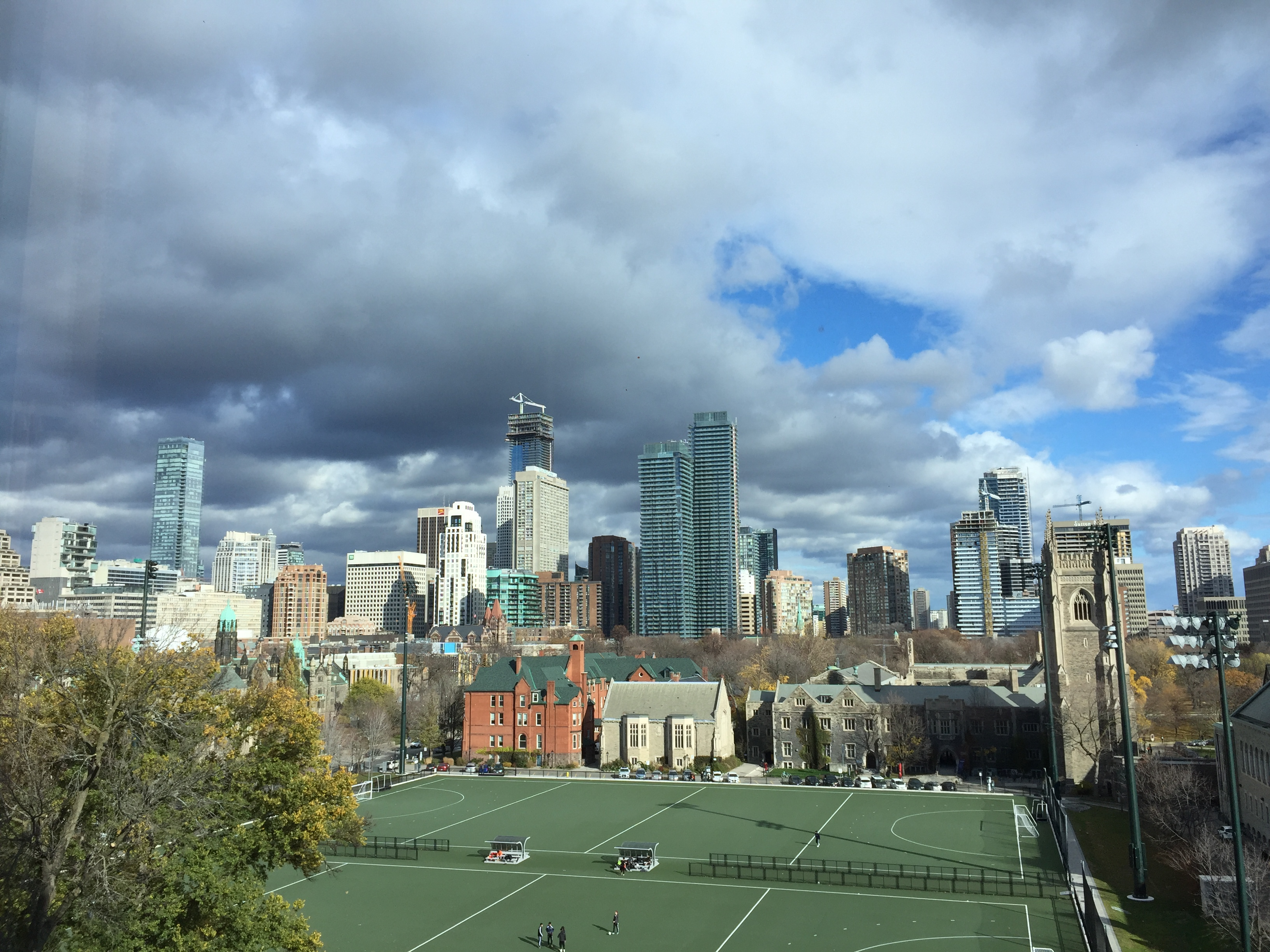
The University of Toronto's St. George campus in the downtown core of the city

The School of Cities was established on July 1, 2018, by the Faculty of Arts and Science Council after three years of planning, with a starting budget of approximately $2 million. Apart from Arts and Science, its interdisciplinary faculty draw from U of T's Faculty of Applied Science and Engineering, John H. Daniels Faculty of Architecture, Landscape, and Design, Rotman School of Management, U of T Mississauga, and U of T Scarborough. Since then it has conducted research at the centre of urban growth in the Greater Toronto Area and informs policy in public sectors. Toronto's recent growth and development going into the twenty-first century has made it the fifth-largest urban area in North America.

It publishes regular reports and interactive tools for data visualization based on statistics gathered from the city and the Greater Toronto Area in metrics such as economics, housing, density, and climate. Affiliated faculty have been interviewed as experts on topics such as the cost of home-owning in Canada and the planned Alto high-speed rail project.

The School of Cities hosts several urban- and urban planning-related undergraduate courses at the University of Toronto and offers fellowships for postgraduate students.

== Centres and collaborations ==
The centre works on and is affiliated with several interdisciplinary initiatives. These include:

- Infrastructure Institute
- Institute on Municipal Finance & Governance
- Housing Justice Lab
- Urban Policy Lab (in partnership with the Munk School of Global Affairs and Public Policy)
- Urban Data Research Centre
- Mobility Network
- Creative Communities Commons

In 2021, the School of Cities and United Way Greater Toronto partnered to establish a Leading Social Justice Fellowship to address social justice issues in the community.

== Affiliated researchers ==
The following is a list of notable academic staff of the University of Toronto formally affiliated with the School of Cities.

- Jeffrey Ansloos
- Karen Chapple
- Richard Florida
- Marc T. J. Johnson
- Marieme Lo
