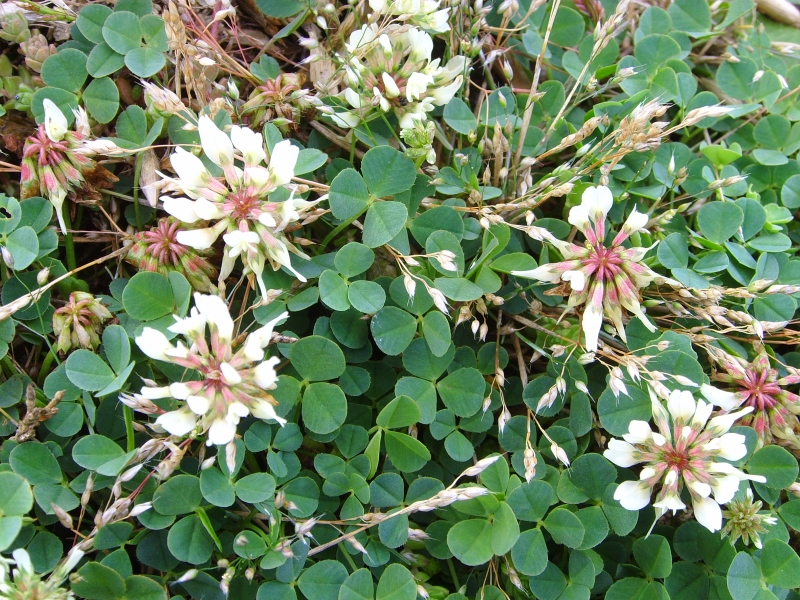

Scientific classification
- Kingdom: Plantae
- Clade: Tracheophytes
- Clade: Angiosperms
- Clade: Eudicots
- Clade: Rosids
- Order: Fabales
- Family: Fabaceae
- Subfamily: Faboideae
- Genus: Trifolium
- Species: T. occidentale

Binomial name
- Trifolium occidentale Coombe

= Trifolium occidentale =

Species of legume

Trifolium occidentale, the western clover, is a clover plant belonging to the genus Trifolium in the legume family, Fabaceae.

This species lives almost exclusively in sand dunes and sea cliffs on the Atlantic coast of Europe, especially Cornwall and the Channel Islands.

== Description ==
Trifolium occidentale is a perennial herb. It is self-compatible, diploid, and stoloniferous. Its flowers are white, similar to white clover (Trifolium repens), with which it has long been confused.

== Taxonomy ==
The species was first described in 1961 by Dr David E Coombe of Cambridge University.

== Distribution and habitat ==
It is found only within 100 metres (330 ft) of the coast, in western Europe. It inhabits sandy dunes, including dune and dry short coastal grasslands and sea cliffs, especially around rock outcrops. Its range extends from the east coast of Ireland and the southern British Isles such as Cornwall, the Channel Islands and Isle of Scilly in particular, to the northwest of the Iberian Peninsula, although much less common. In France, it is found on the shores of the Armorican Massif and Normandy and Brittany.

It was discovered in Ireland in June 1979 and in Wales in 1987. In Ireland it is found "at intervals along the coast from Skerries in north County Dublin to Forlorn Point, County Wexford. It is most common on the Cornish coast. It closely resembles the white clover but appears earlier in the season and is more compact, and the leaves are more opaque, often a blue-green.
