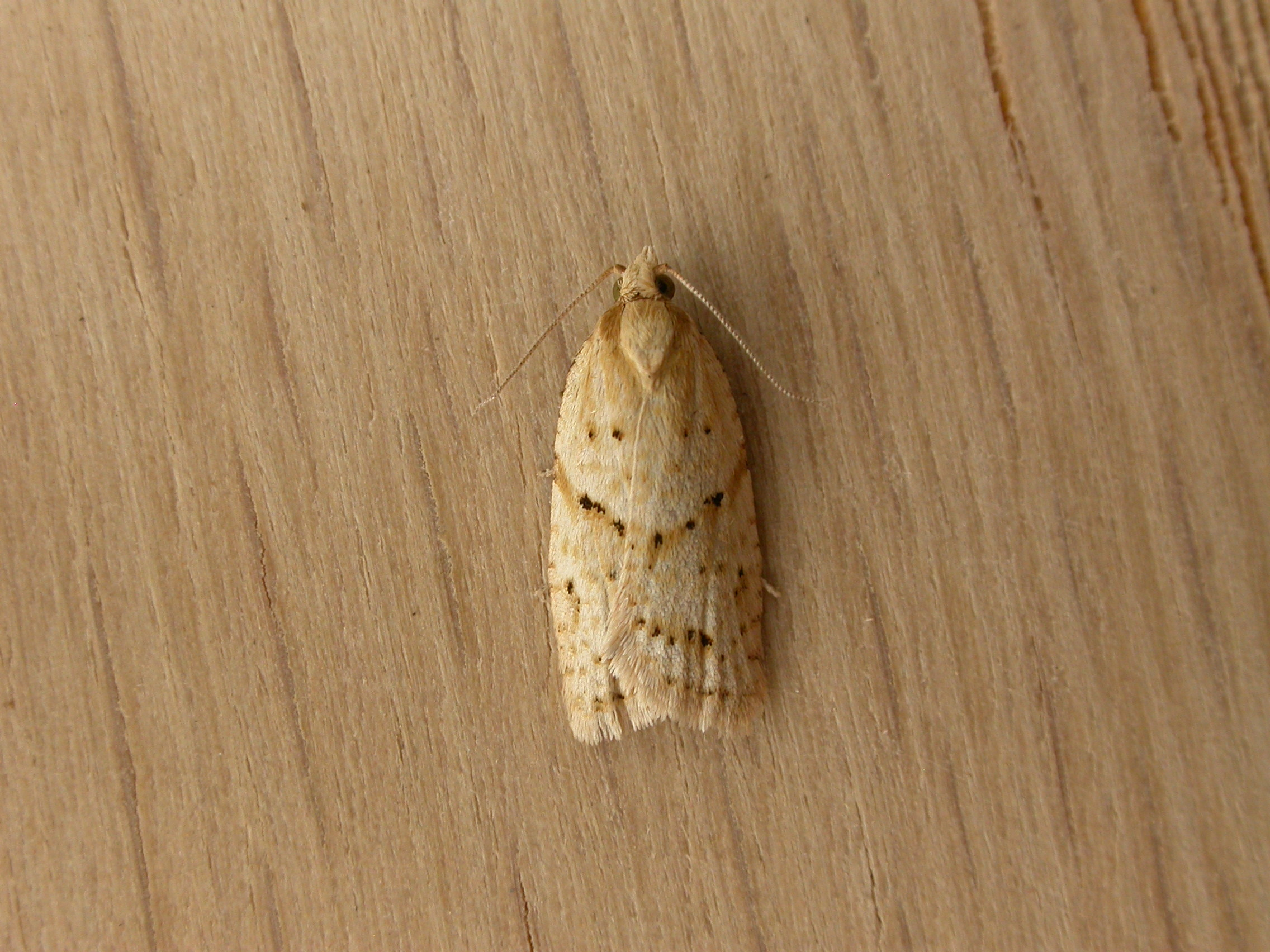

Scientific classification
- Kingdom: Animalia
- Phylum: Arthropoda
- Class: Insecta
- Order: Lepidoptera
- Family: Tortricidae
- Genus: Merophyas
- Species: M. therina

Binomial name
- Merophyas therina (Meyrick, 1910)

Synonyms
- Epichorista therina Meyrick, 1910; Epichorista microstictis Meyrick, 1910

= Merophyas therina =

Species of moth

Merophyas therina is a moth of the family Tortricidae. It is known from Australia, including the Australian Capital Territory and Tasmania. The habitat ranges from wet eucalypt forests to open montane forests.

The larvae feed on Acaena anserinifolia.
