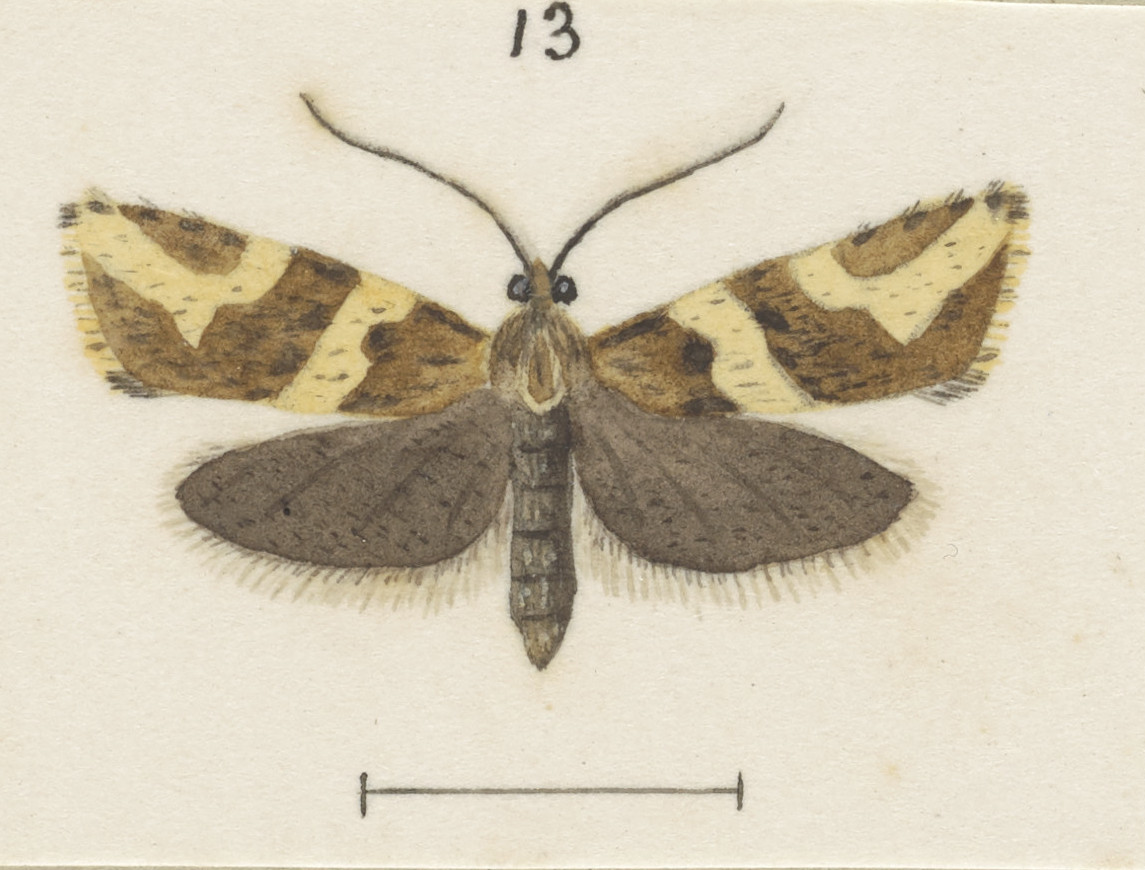
- female

Scientific classification
- Kingdom: Animalia
- Phylum: Arthropoda
- Class: Insecta
- Order: Lepidoptera
- Family: Tortricidae
- Genus: Merophyas
- Species: M. paraloxa

Binomial name
- Merophyas paraloxa (Meyrick, 1907)

Synonyms
- Eurythecta paraloxa Meyrick, 1907

= Merophyas paraloxa =

Species of moth

Merophyas paraloxa is a species of moth of the family Tortricidae. It is found in New Zealand, where it is found on the South Island.

The wingspan is 12–13 mm. The forewings are ochreous whitish, suffused with yellow ochreous and palest on the costa. The markings are yellow ochreous or ferruginous and are variably mixed with dark fuscous. The hindwings are dark grey.
