= Merophyas tenuifascia =

Scientific classification
- Domain: Eukaryota
- Kingdom: Animalia
- Phylum: Arthropoda
- Class: Insecta
- Order: Lepidoptera
- Family: Tortricidae
- Genus: Merophyas
- Species: M. tenuifascia

Binomial name
- Merophyas tenuifascia (Turner, 1927)

Synonyms
- Tortrix tenuifascia Turner, 1927

Species of moth

Merophyas tenuifascia is a species of moth of the family Tortricidae. It is found in Australia, where it has been recorded from Tasmania. The habitat consists of montane open forests.

The wingspan is about 12.5 mm.
