= Sarah E. Diamond =

American ecologist

Sarah Diamond
- Education: Bucknell University (B.S.), University of North Carolina at Chapel Hill (Ph.D.)
- Scientific career
- Fields: Biology, Ecology
- Workplaces: Case Western Reserve University

Sarah E. Diamond is an American ecologist and biologist who is currently the George B. Mayer Chair in Urban and Environmental Studies at Case Western Reserve University in Cleveland, Ohio. As a climate scientist, Diamond's research focuses on predicting how ecological and biological systems will respond and adapt to our changing climates.

== Education ==
Diamond graduated from Bucknell University in 2005 with a Bachelor of Science and then gained her Ph.D. in the field of biology from the Kingsolver Lab at the University of North Carolina at Chapel Hill in 2010. Until 2013, she worked as a postdoctoral research assistant in the Department of Biological Sciences at North Carolina State University.

== Career and research ==
Since 2014, Diamond has been an assistant professor in the Department of Biology at Case Western Reserve University. In 2017, she was appointed as the George B. Mayer Chair in Urban and Environmental Studies.

Much of Diamond's research focuses on predicting how ecological systems and biological organisms will respond to novel environments. Utilizing field study, laboratory research, and computational modeling, she examines the environmental forces that drive organisms to change and the mechanisms that organisms may employ in order to evolve and cope.

Diamond's research predicts how plants and animals will react to the changing climate, all while providing insight into how human behavior affects the mechanisms that force these changes, as well as how humans may be able to mitigate or avoid those mechanisms. Her work on urban evolution gives an indication of how species may respond to stressors such as temperature change. Species display varying abilities to respond to altered environments through both phenotypic plasticity and genetic evolution.

Diamond's work with the acorn ant on urban evolution is helping scientists to better understand how creatures respond to environmental stressors, and how evolution works. Urban environments tend to be hotter and change temperature more rapidly than rural ones. Urban populations of acorn ants have evolved both improved heat tolerance and increased phenotypic plasticity in response to temperature changes in their environment.

Diamond also studies the movement of butterfly species, with the help of citizen scientists. While some species are moving into new territory, others are not. Diamond is studying why, and whether specific traits in different butterfly species relate to their range.

Diamond's scientific publications have been cited 3796 times as of April 1, 2022, giving her an h-index of 33. Among Diamond's most-cited publications are two papers on phenotypic selection. In "Synthetic analyses of phenotypic selection in natural populations: lessons, limitations and future directions", she takes a meta-approach towards analyzing the thousands of published estimations of phenotypic selection, and she uses her analysis to consider how these past estimations may guide her future estimations. In "Phenotypic Selection in Natural Populations: What Limits Directional Selection?" Diamond explores the implications of direct selection, which is a form of natural selection that favors dominant genes over non-dominant genes.

== Awards and recognition ==
- 2018, Early Career Fellow, Ecological Society of America
- 2019, Early Career Development (CAREER) grant, National Science Foundation (NSF)
