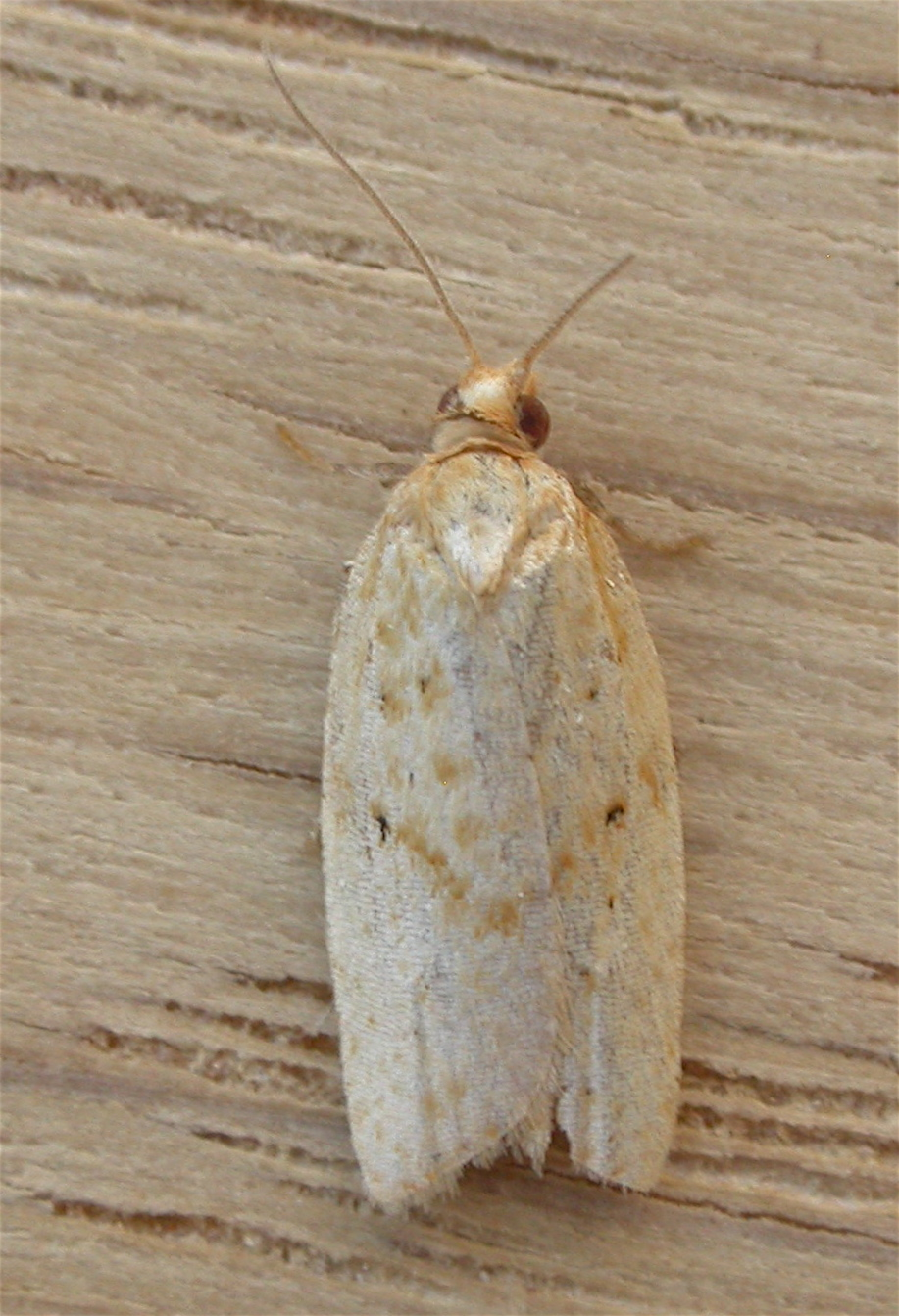

Scientific classification
- Kingdom: Animalia
- Phylum: Arthropoda
- Class: Insecta
- Order: Lepidoptera
- Family: Tortricidae
- Genus: Merophyas
- Species: M. divulsana

Binomial name
- Merophyas divulsana (Walker, 1863)

Synonyms
- Conchylis divulsana Walker, 1863; Bactra australiana Strand, 1924; Tortrix cavillata Meyrick, 1922; Tortrix cnecochyta Turner, 1945; Tortrix glaphyrana Meyrick, 1881; Tortrix ischnosema Turner, 1945; Clepsis divulsana (Walker, 1863)

= Merophyas divulsana =

Species of moth

Merophyas divulsana, also known as the lucerne leaf roller, is a species of moth of the family Tortricidae. It is found throughout Australia and has also been spotted in New Zealand.

The wingspan is about 15 mm (0.59 in).

The larvae are considered a pest to various crops and herbaceous garden plants, including Medicago sativa, Daucus carota, Lactuca sativa, Lonicera japonica, Sclerolaena muricata, Pelargonium x zonale, Mentha spicata and Rumex species.
