= Marieme Lo (academic) =

Senegalese-Canadian academic (born 1966)

- Born: 1966
- Education: Cheikh Anta Diop University, Paris 1 Panthéon-Sorbonne University, Cornell University, Cornell University
- Occupations: Academic, university teacher
- Employer: University of Toronto

Marieme Soda Lo (born 1966) is a Senegalese academic who lives in Canada. She founded the School of Cities at the University of Toronto, where she is the Director of African studies, and holds a professorial position in Women and Gender Studies.

== Early life and education ==
Marieme Lo was born in 1966 in Senegal. Lo earned her licentiate from Paris 1 Panthéon-Sorbonne University, a MA from the University of Dakar and MSc and PhD from Cornell University.

== Career ==
From 2018 to 2021, Mariem Lo served as the associate director for Education for the School of Cities at the University of Toronto. In April 2024, she was one of the participants of an event organized by the United Nations, the third session of the Permanent Forum on People of African Descent. It consisted in a series of meetings to talk about the obstacles that people of African-descent face in their everyday life and the possible solutions.

== Selected papers ==
- "En route to New York: diasporic networks and the reconfiguration of female entrepreneurship in Senegal". Gender, Place & Culture. 23 (4) (published 2 April 2016): 503–520. 26 February 2015. doi:10.1080/0966369X.2015.1013444. ISSN 0966-369X.
- "Beyond Instrumentalism: Interrogating the Micro-dynamic and Gendered and Social Impacts of Remittances in Senegal". Gender, Technology and Development. 12 (3) (published January 2008): 413–437. 25 October 2017. doi:10.1177/097185240901200307. ISSN 0971-8524.
- Oyĕwùmí, Oyèrónkẹ́, ed. (2011). "Self-Image and Self-Naming: A Discursive and Social Analysis of Women's Microenterprises in Senegal and Mali". Gender Epistemologies in Africa. New York: Palgrave Macmillan US. pp. 155–178. doi:10.1057/9780230116276_8. ISBN 978-0-230-11627-6.
- "Confidant par excellence, advisors and healers: women traders' intersecting identities and roles in Senegal". Culture, Health & Sexuality. 15 (Supplement 4): S467–S481. 13 August 2013. doi:10.1080/13691058.2013.793404. ISSN 1369-1058. PMID 23701191.
- "Revisiting the Chad-Cameroon Pipeline Compensation Modality, Local Communities' Discontent, and Accountability Mechanisms". Canadian Journal of Development Studies. 30 (1–2): 153–174. January 2010. doi:10.1080/02255189.2010.9669286.
