= Merophyas petrochroa =

Scientific classification
- Domain: Eukaryota
- Kingdom: Animalia
- Phylum: Arthropoda
- Class: Insecta
- Order: Lepidoptera
- Family: Tortricidae
- Genus: Merophyas
- Species: M. petrochroa

Binomial name
- Merophyas petrochroa (Lower, 1908)

Synonyms
- Capua petrochroa Lower, 1908; Tortrix firmata Meyrick, 1910

Species of moth

Merophyas petrochroa is a species of moth of the family Tortricidae. It is found in Australia, where it has been recorded from Victoria and South Australia.

The wingspan is about 15 mm.
