= Marc T. J. Johnson =

Canadian biologist

Marc Johnson is a professor of biology at the University of Toronto Mississauga. He is the Canada Research Chair for Urban Environmental Science, and was the first Director of the Centre for Urban Environments from 2018-2023. He is also an affiliated faculty member of the School of Cities.

== Education ==
Johnson obtained his Ph.D. in botany from the University of Toronto in 2007, after which he conducted a Natural Sciences and Engineering Research Council (NSERC) Postdoctoral Fellowship at Duke University.

== Research ==
Johnson's research uses concepts and methods from genetics, ecology, evolution and chemistry to look at plants and plant-animal interactions and adaptations to urban environments. His recent work under the Global Urban Evolution Project looked at white clover populations from 160 cities to investigate responses to urban environmental change. Dr. Johnson has over 100 scientific publications. Most cited publications include; "Ecological consequences of genetic diversity", "Evolution of life in urban environments", "Assembly and ecological function of the root microbiome across angiosperm plant species".

== Awards ==
- 2020 NSERC Steacie Fellowship
- 2012 Connaught Early Researcher Award – University of Toronto
- 2012 Early Career Award - Canadian Society of Ecology Evolutionary Biology
- 2012 Early Researcher Award - Ontario Ministry of Research and Innovation
- 2010 Young Investigator Prize – American Society of Naturalists
- 2007 Governor General's Gold Medal - University of Toronto
- 2007 Postdoctoral Fellowship – NSERC Canada
- 2005 Canadian Graduate Scholarship - NSERC Canada
- 2004 Ontario Graduate scholarship
- 2002 Post-graduate Scholarship A - NSERC Canada
- 1998 Undergraduate Student Research Undergraduate Award – NSERC Canada
