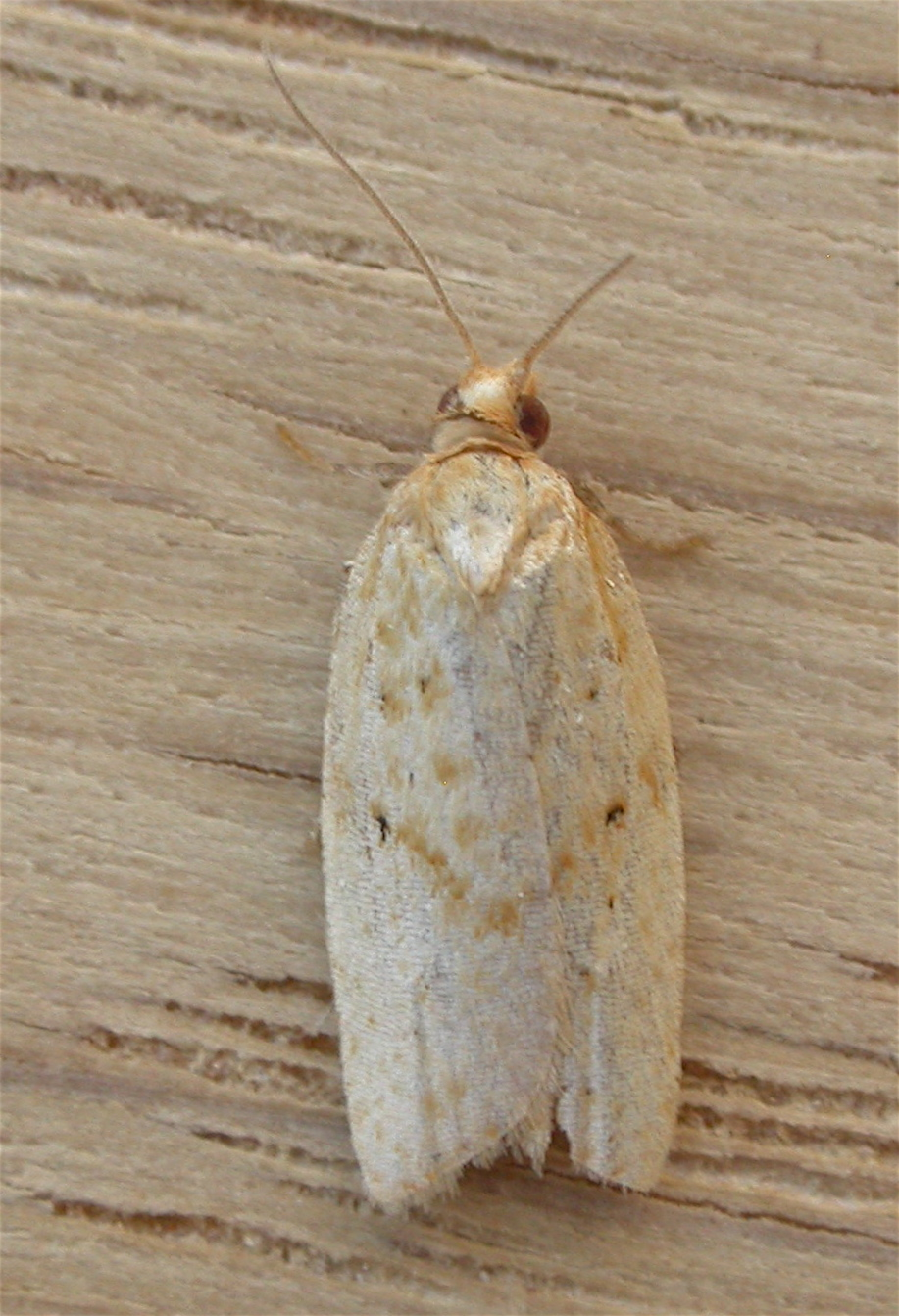
- Merophyas divulsana

Scientific classification
- Domain: Eukaryota
- Kingdom: Animalia
- Phylum: Arthropoda
- Class: Insecta
- Order: Lepidoptera
- Family: Tortricidae
- Tribe: Archipini
- Genus: Merophyas; Common, 1964

= Merophyas =

Genus of tortrix moths

Merophyas is a genus of moths belonging to the subfamily Tortricinae of the family Tortricidae. In December 2015 it was sunk as a synonym of Clepsis Guenée, 1845.

== Species ==
- Merophyas calculata (Meyrick, 1910)
- Merophyas divulsana (Walker, 1863)
- Merophyas immersana (Walker, 1863)
- Merophyas leucaniana (Walker, 1863)
- Merophyas paraloxa (Meyrick, 1907)
- Merophyas petrochroa (Lower, 1908)
- Merophyas scandalota (Meyrick, 1910)
- Merophyas siniodes (Turner, 1945)
- Merophyas tenuifascia (Turner, 1927)
- Merophyas therina (Meyrick, 1910)

== See also ==
- List of Tortricidae genera
