= Merophyas calculata =

Scientific classification
- Kingdom: Animalia
- Phylum: Arthropoda
- Class: Insecta
- Order: Lepidoptera
- Family: Tortricidae
- Genus: Merophyas
- Species: M. calculata

Binomial name
- Merophyas calculata (Meyrick, 1910)

Synonyms
- Tortrix calculata Meyrick, 1910

Species of moth

Merophyas calculata is a species of moth of the family Tortricidae. It is found in Australia, where it has been recorded from Tasmania. The habitat consists of open woodlands.
