= Merophyas scandalota =

Scientific classification
- Kingdom: Animalia
- Phylum: Arthropoda
- Class: Insecta
- Order: Lepidoptera
- Family: Tortricidae
- Genus: Merophyas
- Species: M. scandalota

Binomial name
- Merophyas scandalota (Meyrick, 1910)

Synonyms
- Tortrix scandalota Meyrick, 1910

Species of moth

Merophyas scandalota is a species of moth of the family Tortricidae. It is found in Australia, where it has been recorded from Victoria and the Australian Capital Territory.

The wingspan is 14.5-16.5 mm.
