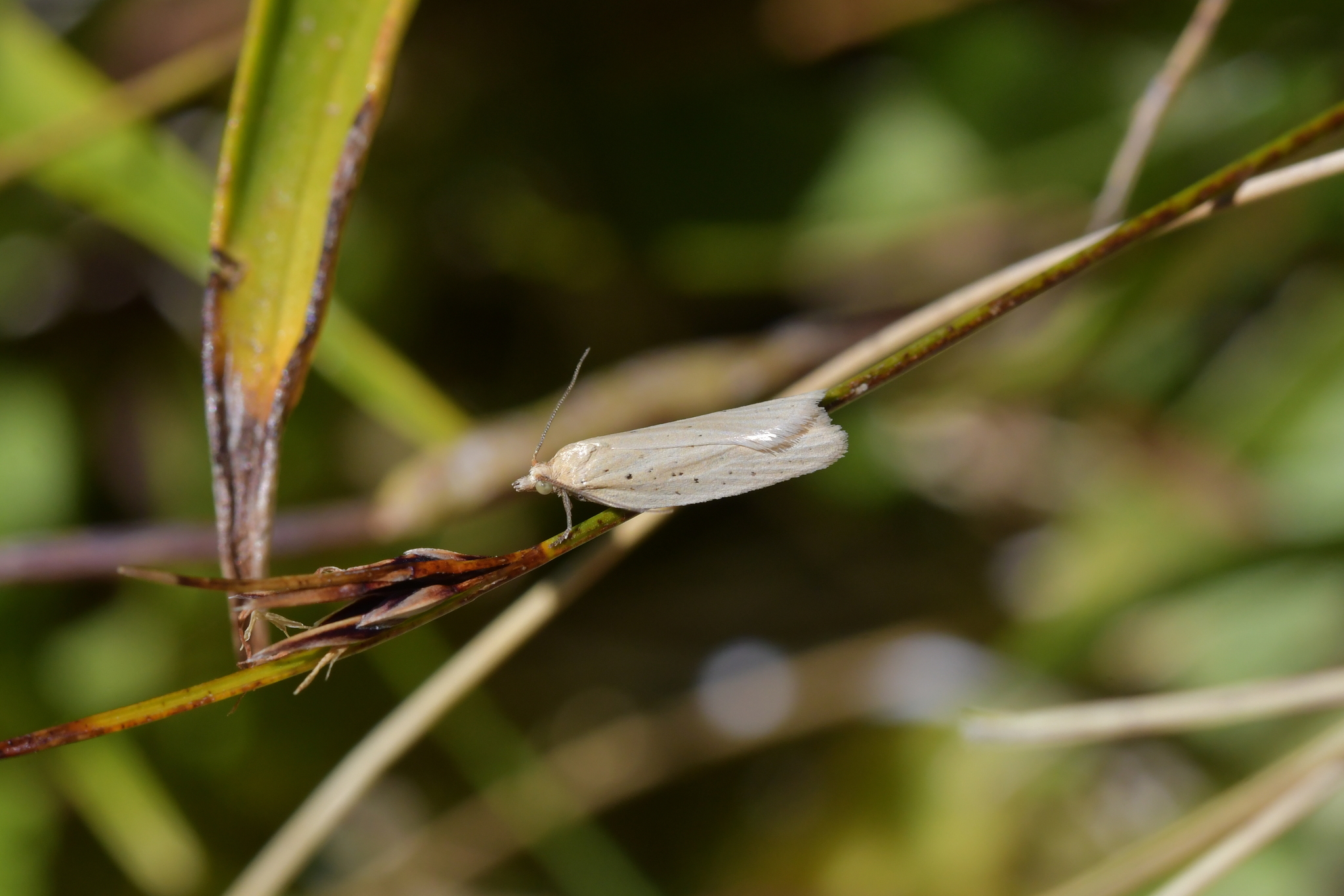
- Clepsis lecuaniana in Westland District

Scientific classification
- Kingdom: Animalia
- Phylum: Arthropoda
- Class: Insecta
- Order: Lepidoptera
- Family: Tortricidae
- Genus: Clepsis
- Species: C. leucaniana

Binomial name
- Clepsis leucaniana (Walker, 1863)

Synonyms
- Conchylis leucaniana Walker, 1863; Gelechia intactella Walker, 1864; Merophyas leucaniana (Walker, 1863); Teras pauculana Walker, 1866; Tortrix philopoana Meyrick, 1881

= Clepsis leucaniana =

Species of moth

Clepsis leucaniana is a species of moth of the family Tortricidae. It is found in New Zealand. It was formerly in the genus Merophyas.

The forewings are whitish straw, with slightly darker lines along the veins. There are two brown discal stripes. The hindwings are whitish cinereous.
