= Karen Chapple =

American city planning academic

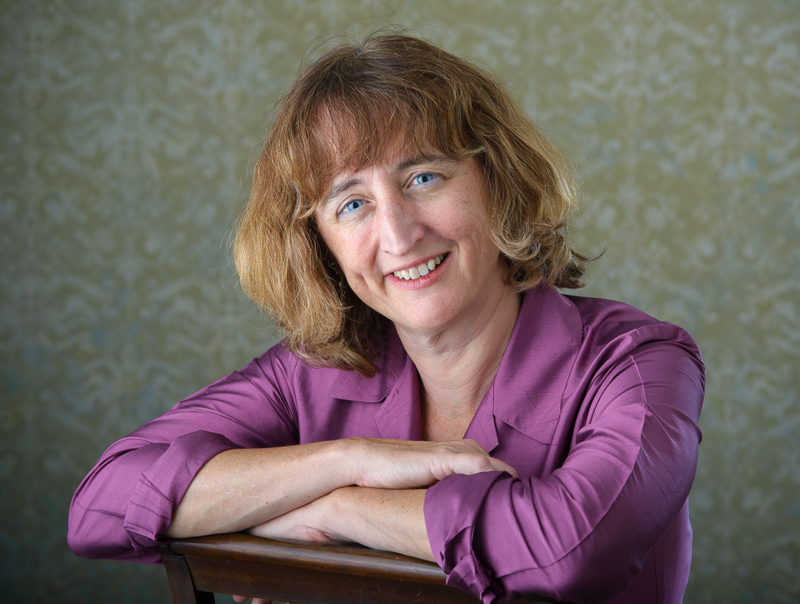
- Chapple in 2015
- Occupations: Professor and Department Chair of City and Regional Planning at the University of California, Berkeley

Academic background
- Education: Columbia University (BA); Pratt Institute (M.S.C.R.P.); University of California, Berkeley (PhD)
- Website: karenchapple.com

Karen Chapple is an American city planning academic and director of the School of Cities at the University of Toronto. She also currently holds the Carmel P. Friesen Chair in Urban Studies at the University of California, Berkeley.

== Education ==
Chapple received an undergraduate degree in Urban Studies at Columbia University, a Masters of Science in Community and Regional Planning from Pratt Institute and a Ph.D. in City and Regional Planning from University of California, Berkeley.

== Career ==
Chapple's research on the planning, development, and governance of regions is distinguished by its focus on equitable development, community-engaged approach, and increasingly, analysis of big data and use of public dissemination strategies. Since 2006, Chapple has served as the faculty director for the Center for Community Innovation (CCI), a research center at the University of California, Berkeley. The CCI promotes equitable and resilient futures via research on housing, land use, economic development and urban sustainability issues. Over the past decade, Chapple has raised $7.5 million to fund research and technical assistance by the center. The CCI houses three major projects to support the diversifying of housing options and expansion of economic opportunities: The Urban Displacement Project (UDP), Planning Sustainable Regions and Planning for Jobs. The UDP, which was co-founded by Chapple in 2015, was created in order to be an action and research initiative to promote equitable development in future cities.

Chapple has also served on the faculties of the University of Minnesota and the University of Pennsylvania. At the onset of her career, she worked for the New York City Department of Transportation, Philip Habib & Associates, the San Francisco Planning Department, and Strategic Economics.

She is a Professor in the Department of Geography and Planning at the University of Toronto and the director of the School of Cities, a research centre affiliated with the university.

== Honors ==
- John Friedmann Book Award from the American Collegiate Schools of Planning (for Planning Sustainable Cities and Regions), 2018
- Fulbright Global Scholar Award, 2017–18.
- Chancellor's Public Service Award for Research in the Public Interest, University of California-Berkeley, 2017.
- Bacon Public Lectureship and White Paper Award, University of California Sacramento Center, 2015–16.
- American Planning Association California Chapter, Academic Award, Leveraging Lawrence Berkeley National Lab's Second Campus for Regional Economic Development, 2012.
- Theodore Bo Lee and Doris Shoong Lee Chair of Environmental Design, July 2006-June 2000.
- Chancellor's University-Community Partnership Award, 2006–2007.
- City of Richmond Public Service Award (for the Center for Community Innovation), 2006.
- Barclay Gibbs Jones Award for Best Dissertation in Planning, 2000.

== Books ==
- Transit-Oriented Displacement? The Effects of Smarter Growth on Communities by Karen Chapple and Anastasia Loukaitou-Sideris, 2019 (MIT Press).
- Fragile Governance and Local Economic Development: Theory and Evidence from Peripheral Regions in Latin America by Sergio Montero and Karen Chapple, 2018 (Routledge).
- Planning sustainable cities and regions: Towards more equitable development by Karen Chapple, 2015 (Routledge)

== Volunteer boards and advisory appointments ==
- Editorial Board Member, Economic Development Quarterly (2003–present), Journal of Planning Education and Research (2009–present), Journal of the American Planning Association (2014–present)
- Affiliated faculty, School of Information, Institute for Research on Labor & Employment, UC-Berkeley (2002–present), Institute for Governmental Studies (2015–present), Arts Research Center (2010–present), Center for Latin American Studies (2015–present)
- Member, Berkeley Planning Commission, 2015–2017.
- Co-Editor, Journal of Planning Education and Research (2005-2008)
