= Merophyas siniodes =

Scientific classification
- Domain: Eukaryota
- Kingdom: Animalia
- Phylum: Arthropoda
- Class: Insecta
- Order: Lepidoptera
- Family: Tortricidae
- Genus: Merophyas
- Species: M. siniodes

Binomial name
- Merophyas siniodes (Turner, 1945)

Synonyms
- Meritastis siniodes Turner, 1945

Species of moth

Merophyas siniodes is a species of moth of the family Tortricidae. It is found in Australia, where it has been recorded from South Australia.

The wingspan is 17.5-21 mm. The forewings are white, finely reticulated and strigulated (finely streaked) with greyish yellow. The hindwings are white.
