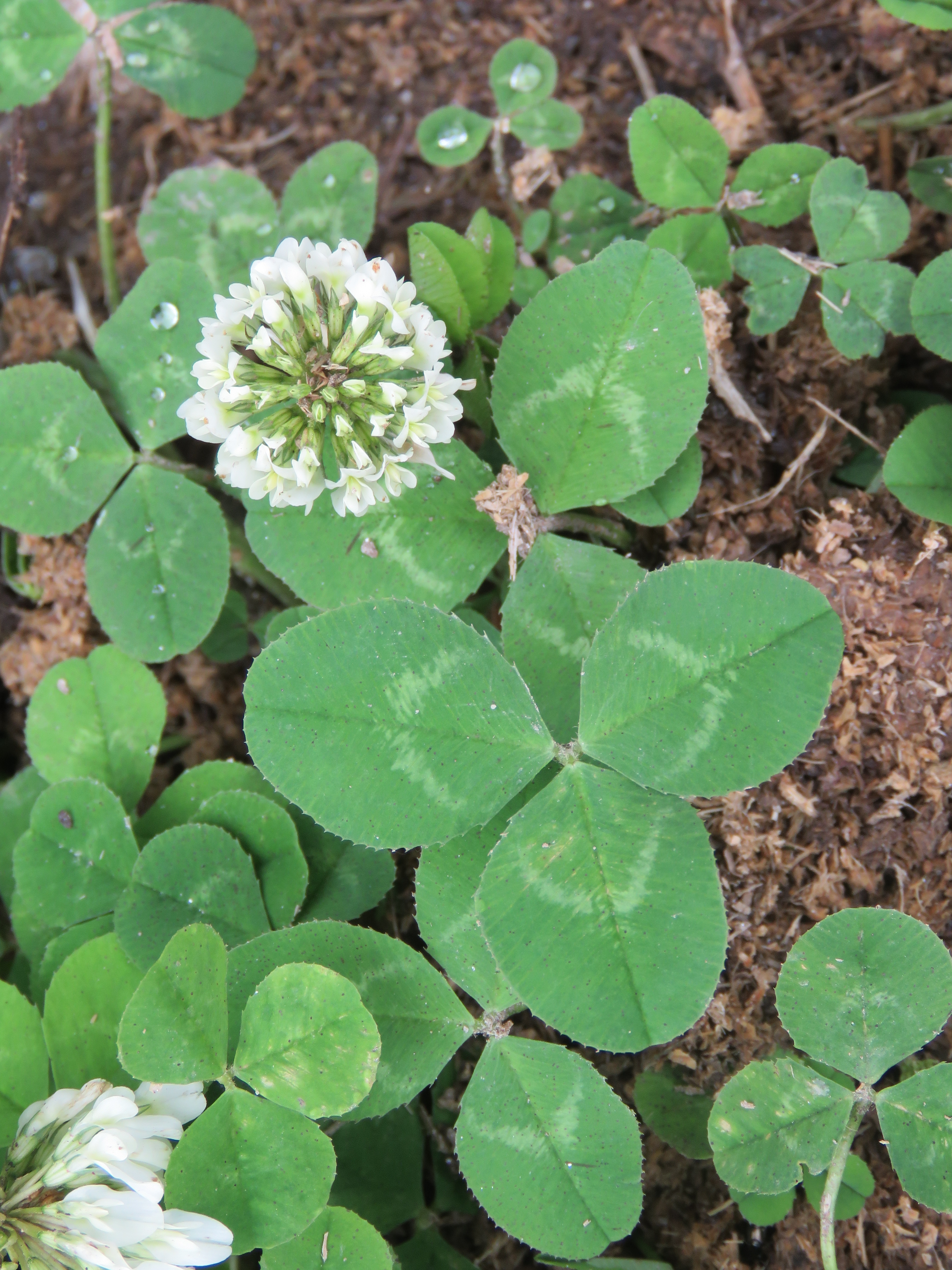

Scientific classification
- Kingdom: Plantae
- Clade: Tracheophytes
- Clade: Angiosperms
- Clade: Eudicots
- Clade: Rosids
- Order: Fabales
- Family: Fabaceae
- Subfamily: Faboideae
- Genus: Trifolium
- Species: T. repens

Binomial name
- Trifolium repens L.

Synonyms
- Synonymy: Amoria repens (L.) C.Presl; Lotodes repens Kuntze; Trifolium limonium Phil.; Trifolium stipitatum Clos; Trifolium macrorrhizum Boiss., syn of subsp. macrorrhizum; Trifolium nevadense Boiss., syn of var. nevadense; Trifolium orbelicum Velen., syn of var. orbelicum; Trifolium orphanideum Boiss., syn of var. orphanideum; Trifolium biasolettii Steud. & Hochst., syn of subsp. prostratum; Trifolium occidentale Coombe, syn of subsp. prostratum

= Trifolium repens =

White clover

Species of flowering plant

Trifolium repens, the white clover, is a herbaceous perennial plant in the bean family, Fabaceae (also known as Leguminosae).

The species is native to Eurasia and is one of the most widely cultivated types of clover. It has been widely introduced worldwide as a forage crop, and is now also common in most grassy areas of North and South America, Australia and New Zealand.

== Description ==
It is a low-growing herbaceous, perennial plant. The leaves are trifoliolate, smooth, elliptic to egg-shaped, long-petioled, and usually with light or dark markings. The stems function as stolons, so white clover often forms mats, with the stems creeping as much as 18 centimetres (7 in) a year, and rooting at the nodes. The leaves form the symbol known as shamrock. Almost always, a white clover will be trifoliolate (have three leaflets). However, one can, but only sometimes, possess four or more leaflets. The species includes varieties often classed as small, intermediate and large, according to height, which reflects petiole length.

It produces flowering heads of whitish florets, often with a tinge of pink or cream that may come on with the aging of the plant. The heads are generally 1.5–2 cm (1/2–3/4 in) wide, and are at the end of 7 cm (2 3/4 in) peduncles or inflorescence stalks. The flowers are mostly visited by bumblebees and often by honey bees.

White clover spreads vegetatively through creeping above-ground stems known as stolons, which form adventitious roots at their nodes. Patches of clover can potentially double in diameter during a growing season.

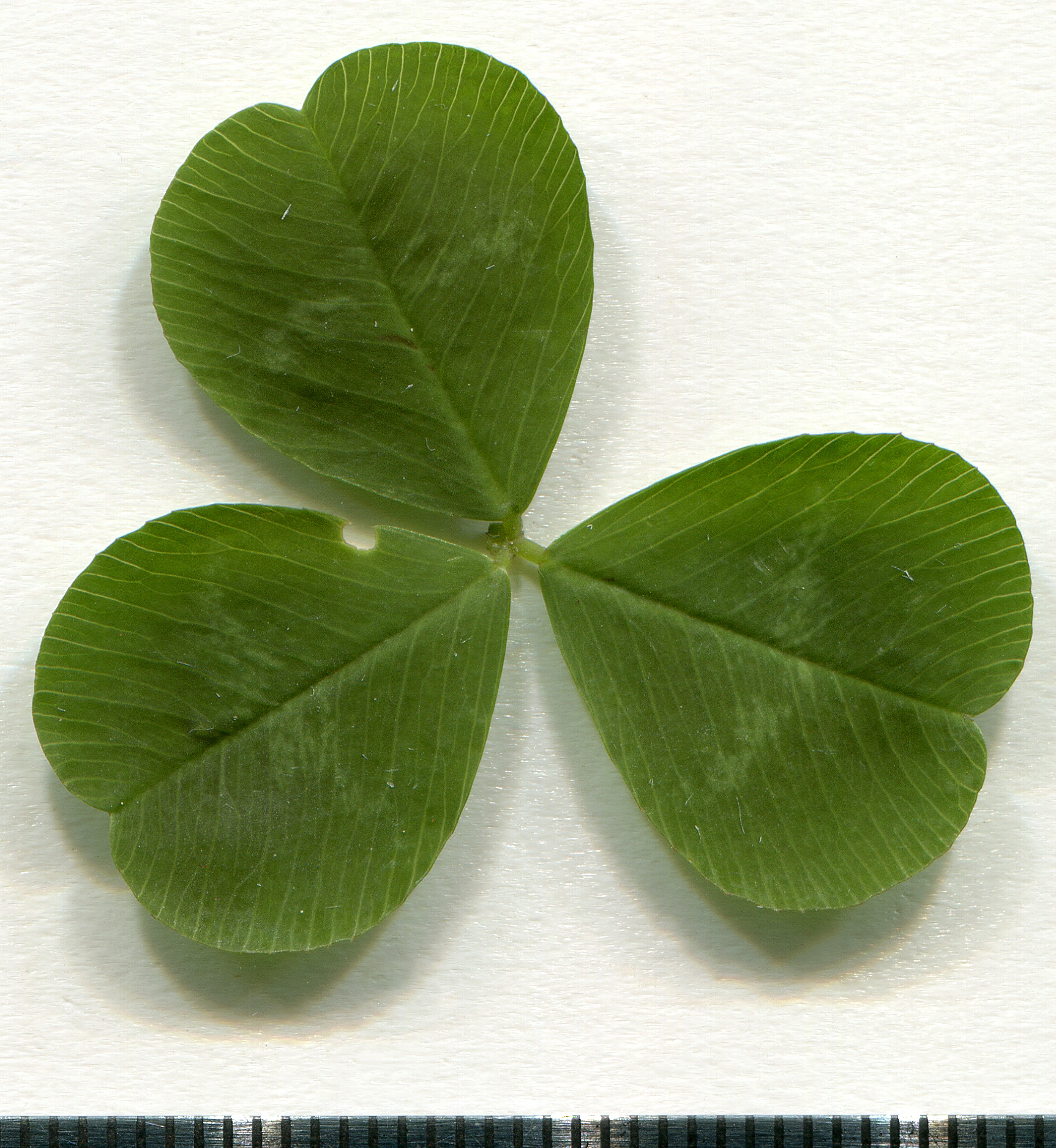
Leaf

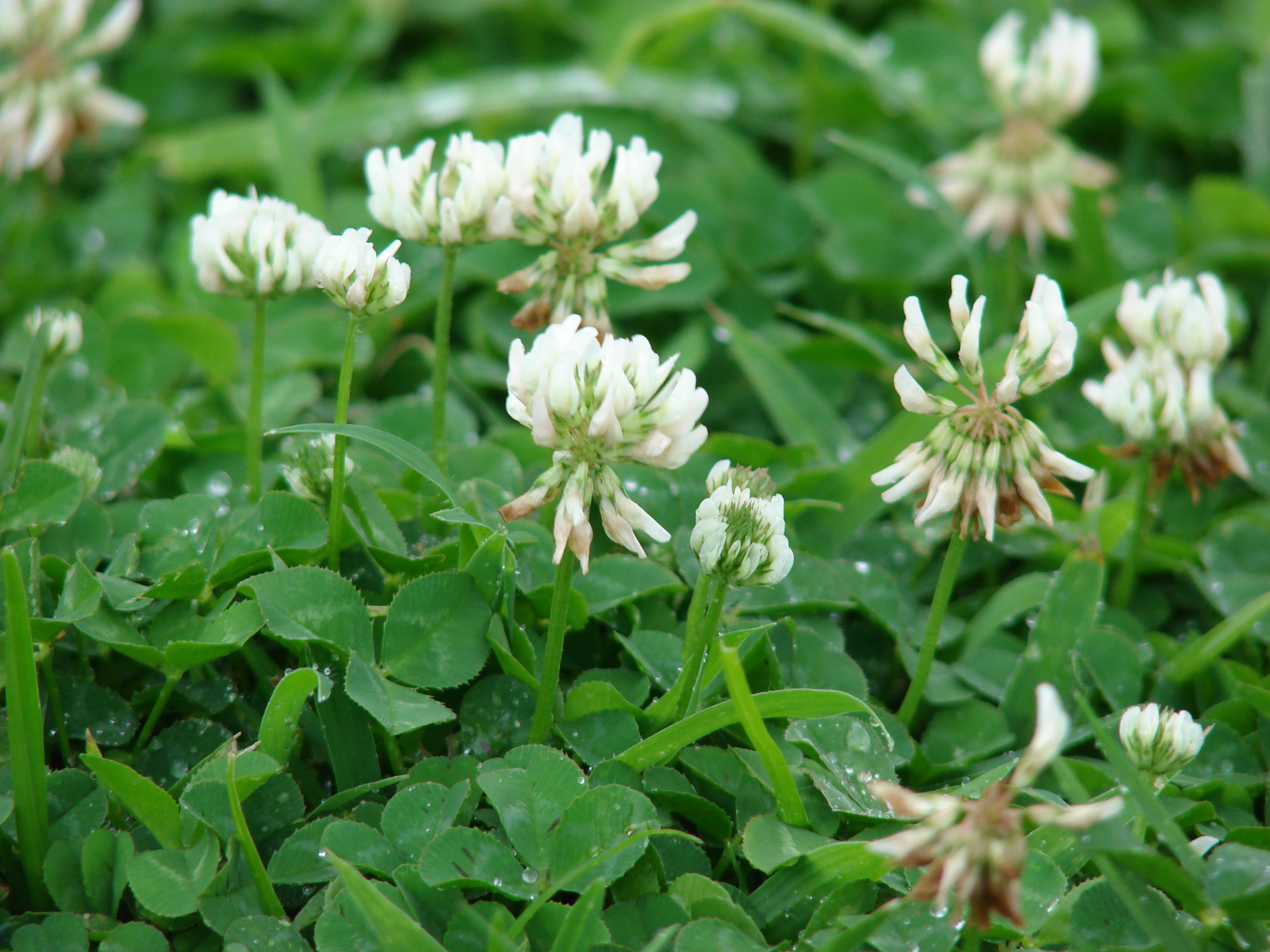
Flowering

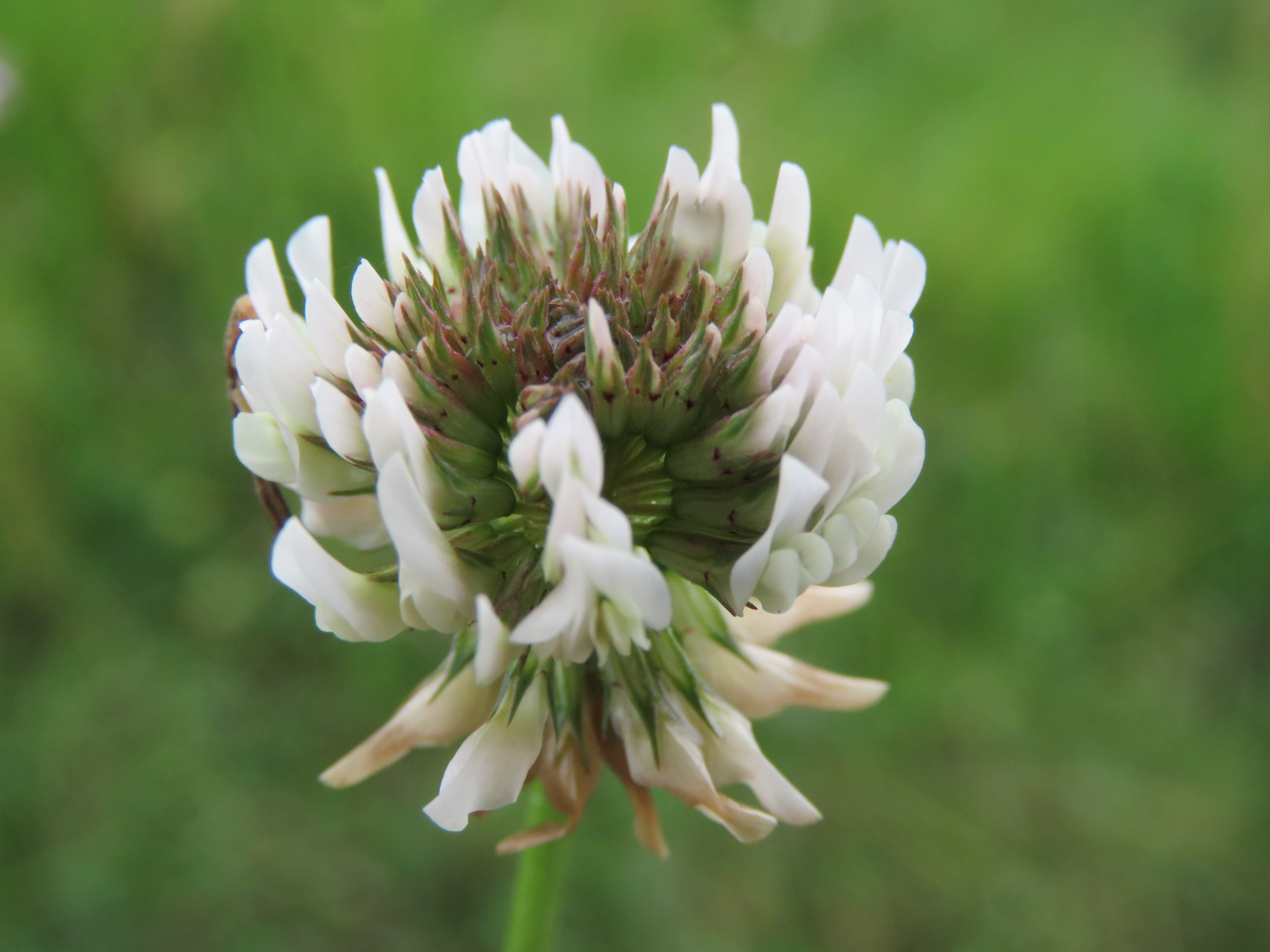
Flower close-up

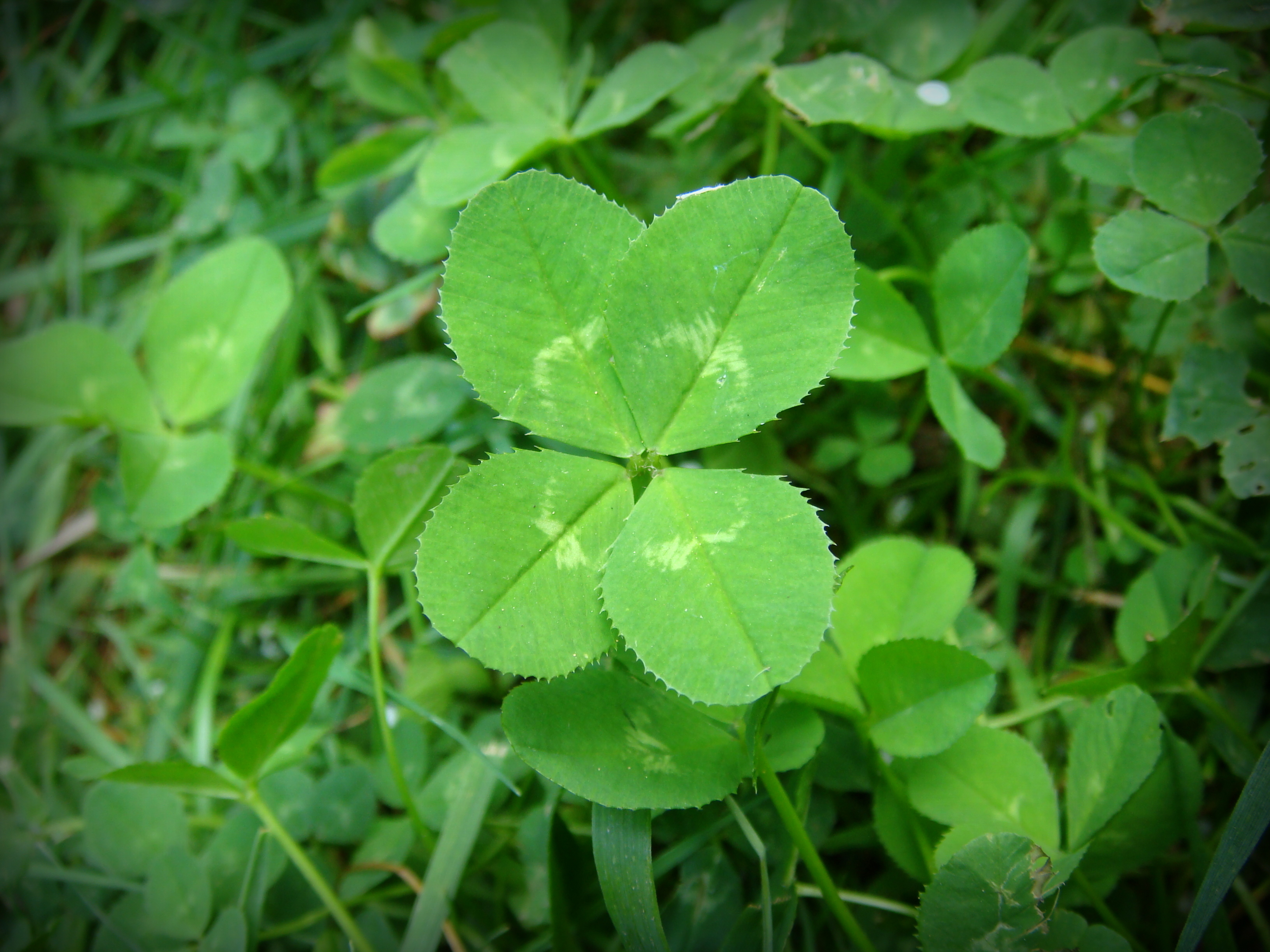
Four-leaf specimen

== Taxonomy ==
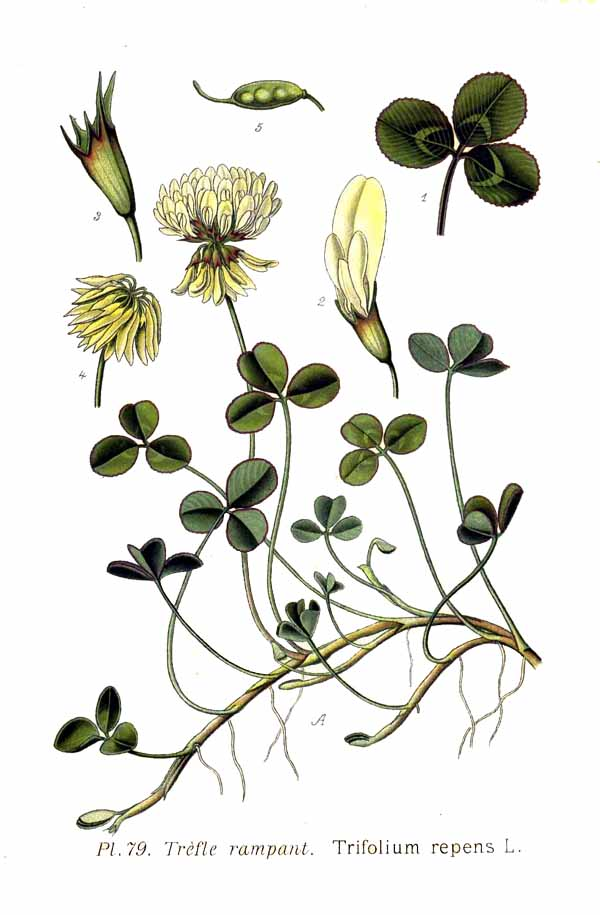
Botanical illustration

=== Ancestry ===
Trifolium repens is an allotetraploid (2n = 4x = 32) of two diploid ancestors and exhibits disomic inheritance. In order to increase genetic diversity for breeding, research is focused on finding these ancestors. Proposed ancestors of T. repens include T. nigrescens, T. occidentale, T. pallescens, and T. uniflorum. Additionally, it is possible that one of the diploid ancestors has yet to be analyzed, either because it has not been discovered or is extinct.

=== Varieties and subspecies ===
- Trifolium repens subsp. macrorrhizum (Boiss.) Ponert
- Trifolium repens var. nevadense (Boiss.) C.Vicioso
- Trifolium repens var. ochranthum K.Maly
- Trifolium repens var. orbelicum (Velen.) Fritsch
- Trifolium repens var. orphanideum (Boiss.) Boiss.
- Trifolium repens var. pipolina
- Trifolium repens subsp. prostratum Nyman

=== Etymology ===
The genus name, Trifolium, derives from the Latin tres, "three", and folium, "leaf", so called from the characteristic form of the leaf, which almost always has three leaflets. The species name, repens, is Latin for "creeping".

The term 'white clover' is applied to the species in general, 'Dutch clover' is often applied to intermediate varieties (but sometimes to smaller varieties), and 'ladino clover' is applied to large varieties.

== Distribution and habitat ==
It is native in Europe and Central Asia, ubiquitous throughout the British Isles, introduced in North America, South Africa, Australia, New Zealand, Japan and elsewhere, and globally cultivated as a forage crop.

It is common in most grassy areas (lawns and gardens) of North and South America, Australia and New Zealand.

== Ecology ==
White clover has been used as a model organism for global research into ecology and urban evolution. As part of the Global Urban Evolution Project, scientists from 26 countries examined the production of cyanide by over 110,000 clover plants from 160 cities. Cyanide can be useful to clover plants as a deterrent to herbivores. Analyzing urban-rural differences, scientists found that cyanide production tended to increase with distance from the center of cities, suggesting that clover populations were adapting to factors commonly found in urban centers worldwide. Possible factors could include temperature (freezing is related to cyanide content), herbivory pressures, and drought stress. As clover habitats, the downtowns of cities may more closely resemble other far-flung cities than nearby rural areas.

== Cultivation and uses ==
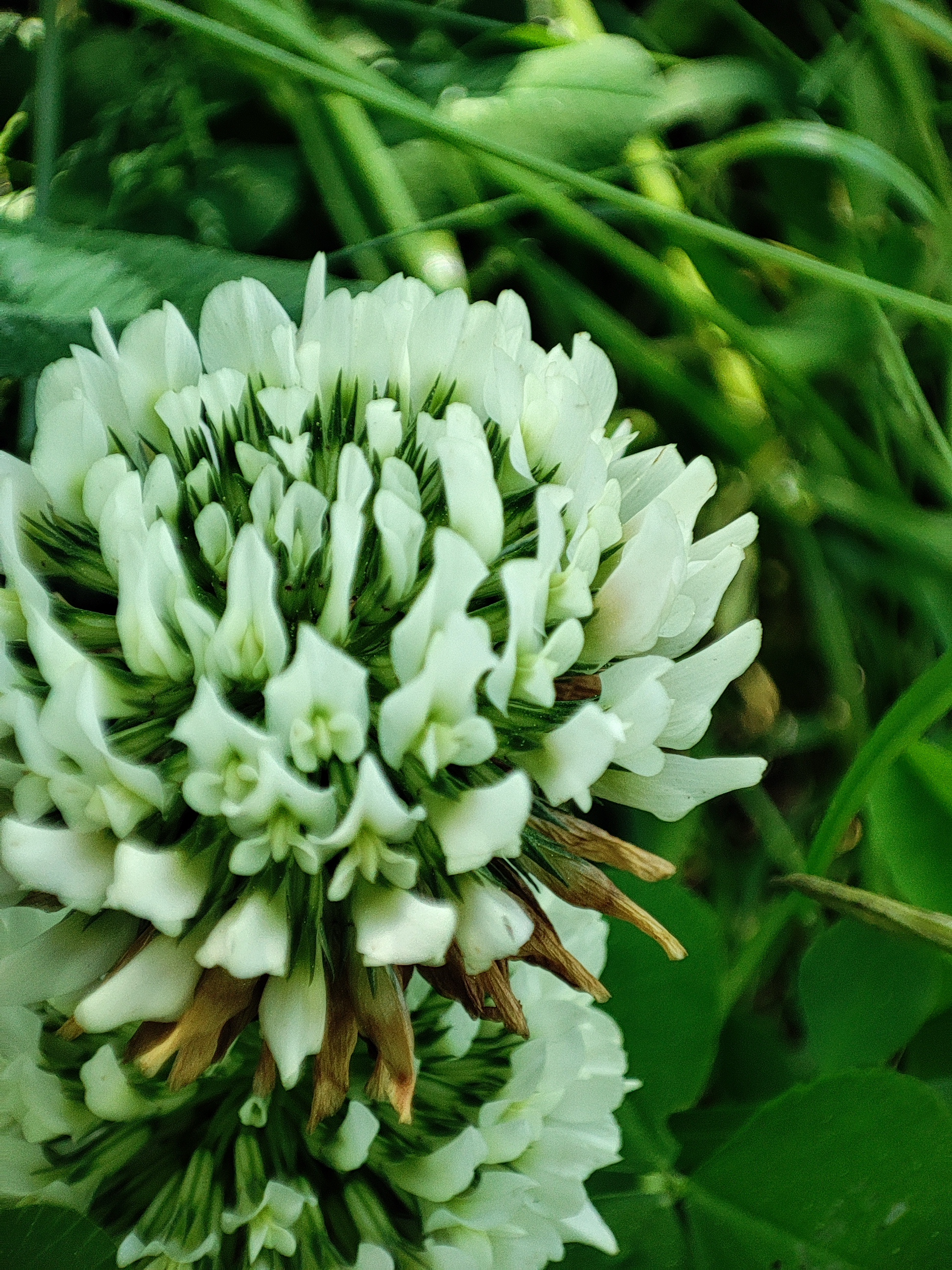
Closeup of white clover

=== Forage ===
White clover has been described as the most important forage legume of the temperate zones. Symbiotic nitrogen fixation (up to 545 kilograms per hectare per year (486 lb/acre/a) of N, although usually much less, e.g. about 110 to 170 kilograms per hectare per year (98 to 152 lb/acre/a)) in root nodules of white clover obviates synthetic nitrogen fertilizer use for maintaining productivity on much temperate zone pasture land. White clover is commonly grown in mixtures with forage grasses, e.g. perennial ryegrass (Lolium perenne). Such mixtures can not only optimize livestock production, but can also reduce the bloat risk to livestock that can be associated with excessive white clover in pastures. Such species mixtures also tend to avoid issues that could otherwise be associated with cyanogenic glycosides (linamarin and lotaustralin) intake on pure or nearly pure stands of some white clover varieties. However, problems do not inevitably arise with grazing on monocultures of white clover, and superior ruminant production is sometimes achieved on white clover monocultures managed to optimize sward height.

The O-methylated isoflavones formononetin and biochanin A play a role in arbuscular mycorrhiza formation on white clover roots, and foliar disease can stimulate production of estrogenic coumestans in white clover. However, while there have been a few reports of phytoestrogenic effects of white clover on grazing ruminants, these have been far less common than such reports regarding some varieties of subterranean clover (Trifolium subterraneum) and red clover (Trifolium pratense). Among forage plants, some white clover varieties tend to be favored by rather close grazing, because of their stoloniferous habit, which can contribute to competitive advantage.

=== Companion planting, green manure, and cover crops ===
White clover grows well as a companion plant among lawns, grain crops, pasture grasses, and vegetable rows. It is often added to lawn seed mixes, as it is able to grow and provide green cover in poorer soils where turfgrasses do not perform well. White clover can tolerate close mowing and grazing, and it can grow on many different types and pHs of soil (although it prefers clay soils). As a leguminous and hardy plant, it is considered to be a beneficial component of natural or organic pasture management and lawn care due to its ability to fix nitrogen and out-compete weeds. Natural nitrogen fixing reduces leaching from the soil and by maintaining soil health can reduce the incidence of some lawn diseases that are enhanced by the availability of synthetic fertilizer. For these reasons, it is often used as a green manure and cover crop.

=== Culinary uses ===
Besides making an excellent forage crop for livestock, its leaves and flowers are a valuable survival food: they are high in proteins, and are widespread and abundant. The fresh plants have been used for centuries as additives to salads and other meals consisting of leafy vegetables. They are not easy for humans to digest raw, however this is easily fixed by boiling the harvested plants for 5–10 minutes. Native Americans ate some species raw. Dried white clover flowers may also be smoked as a herbal alternative to tobacco; they should not be eaten too long after picking, however, due to formation of cyanides.

=== Medicinal uses ===
In India, T. repens is considered a folk medicine against intestinal helminthic worms, and an experimental in-vivo study validated that the aerial shoots of T. repens bear significant anticestodal (anti-tapeworm) properties.

== Bibliography ==
- Frame, J.; Charlton, J.F.L.; Laidlaw, A.S. (1998), Temperate Forage Legumes, Wallingford, Oxon: CAB International, pp. 15–106, ISBN 0851992145
