= Jeffrey Ansloos =

Canadian scholar

- Born: January 16, 1987 (age 39); Winnipeg, Manitoba
- Occupations: Academic, author, psychologist

Academic background
- Education: Trinity Western University (BA); Fuller Graduate School of Psychology (MA, PhD); Fuller Seminary (MA); University of Manitoba (Residency)

Academic work
- Main interests: Colonialism, Indigeneity, and Decolonization; Indigenous Studies in Education and Health; Social Determinants of Indigenous Peoples' Health; Structural Dimensions of Health; Critical Suicide Studies; Suicide Prevention; Community Psychology; Qualitative Research; Abolition
- Notable works: The Medicine of Peace: Indigenous Youth Resisting Violence and Decolonizing Healing; Thunder and the Noise Storms

Jeffrey Ansloos is a Canadian scholar known for his work in mental health, suicide prevention, critical suicide studies, and social and environmental dimensions of health. His work in these areas is in partnership with Indigenous Peoples, youth, people experiencing homelessness, and 2SLGBTQ+ peoples. He is an associate professor of Indigenous Health and Social Policy at the Ontario Institute for Studies in Education at the University of Toronto, and holds the Canada Research Chair in Indigenous Studies of Health, Suicide Studies, and Environmental Justice. He is an appointed member of the Royal Society of Canada’s College of New Scholars, Artists and Scientists and a fellow at the Broadbent Institute. He is also a children's book author.

Ansloos' work sits at the intersection of Indigenous mental health, Critical Suicide Studies and Critical Geography. He is an affiliate faculty member at the School of Cities at the University of Toronto.

== Education ==
Ansloos earned a Bachelor of Arts in Religious Studies from Trinity Western University in Langley, British Columbia in 2008. He then pursued graduate studies at Fuller Theological Seminary in Pasadena, California, completing a Master of Arts in Psychology in 2010 under the supervision of Cynthia Eriksson. His thesis, conducted in collaboration with the Antares Foundation and the Centers for Disease Control and Prevention (CDC), investigated traumatic stress among humanitarian aid workers assisting Iraqi and Palestinian refugees. In 2014, he obtained a Doctor of Philosophy in Clinical Psychology from Fuller Theological Seminary under the supervision of Alvin Dueck. His doctoral research focused on culturally relevant and trauma-informed mental health care for justice-involved First Nations, Métis, and Inuit youth in Canada. Concurrently, between 2008 and 2013, he completed a second Master of Arts in Theology at Fuller Theological Seminary, with research in liberation theology, ethics, and contextual theology. Between 2008 and 2012, Ansloos completed clinical training with the Los Angeles County Department of Health Services, the Alhambra Unified School District, and Fuller Psychological and Family Services. From 2013 to 2014, he undertook a Residency in Clinical Health Psychology at the University of Manitoba in the Faculty of Community Health Sciences, training within the Winnipeg and Interlake Regional Health Authority.

== Academic career ==
Ansloos joined the University of Toronto in 2018 appointed to the Department of Applied Psychology and Human Development at the Ontario Institute for Studies in Education, where he was awarded tenure in 2022. He holds a cross-appointment in Psychiatry at the Temerity Faculty of Medicine and is affiliated with the School of Cities. Since 2019, he has held the Canada Research Chair in Indigenous Studies of Health, Suicide Studies, and Environmental Justice, a position previously titled Critical Studies in Indigenous Health and Social Action on Suicide (2019–2024). His research examines the structural determinants of suicide, the impact of environmental change on mental health among First Nations and Inuit, and the development of culturally responsive and upstream mental health interventions and prevention strategy.

Before joining the University of Toronto, Ansloos was an Assistant Professor of Interdisciplinary Studies at Lesley University (2014–2015) and an Assistant Professor of Human and Social Development at the University of Victoria (2015–2017). At the University of Victoria, he was a member of the School of Child and Youth Care and affiliated with the Centre for Youth and Society and the Centre for Religion and Society. In 2016, he was named a Fellow of the United Nations Alliance of Civilizations in recognition of his contributions to intercultural and interfaith dialogue and peace education. In 2017, he was awarded the Digital Indigenous Studies Fellowship at Indiana University–Purdue University Indianapolis. From 2022 to 2023, he was a visiting faculty member at the University of Western Australia at the Centre for Best Practice in Indigenous and Torres Strait Islander Suicide Prevention, where he contributed to international collaborations on Indigenous mental health and suicide prevention.

In 2018, he founded the Critical Health and Social Action Lab (CHSA Lab) at the University of Toronto, which conducts research on Indigenous life promotion, climate justice, and community-led interventions in mental health. In 2024, he launched the Suicide Justice Salon. Inspired by the work of Kristen Cardon, the “suicide justice" salon offers an interdisciplinary space for the study of suicide, attending to racial, economic, environmental, sexual, gender dimensions of the phenomena. His research has been supported by the Social Sciences and Humanities Research Council (SSHRC), the Canadian Institutes of Health Research (CIHR), and the Canada Foundation for Innovation (CFI).

His academic work includes publications in leading journals such as The Lancet, American Psychologist, Canadian Psychology, The Journal of Community Psychology, Canadian Journal of Public Health, and International Journal of Indigenous Health, among others. His books include The Medicine of Peace: Indigenous Youth Resisting Violence and Decolonizing Healing (2017).

== Public Engagement and Media ==
Ansloos has been featured in national and international media discussing Indigenous rights and health and social policy issues. He has contributed to major broadcast radio and television news, in forums like CBC. He has been featured on numerous podcasts including The Red Nation, Media Indigena, and has authored op-eds in Maclean’s and HuffPost.

== Professional Memberships and Service ==
Ansloos is an active member of several professional organizations, including the Canadian Psychological Association, where he previously served as the Chair of the Indigenous Peoples’ Psychology Section; the Native American and Indigenous Studies Association; the Critical Suicide Studies Network, and the International Suicide Prevention Association. He is a founding member of the Critical Public Health Network. He currently serves on the Board of Directors for the Canadian Association for Suicide Prevention and is a National Advisory Circle member for the First Peoples Wellness Circle.

== Awards ==
Ansloos has received multiple distinctions for his contributions to Indigenous health research, mental health policy, and graduate education. In 2022, he was elected to the Royal Society of Canada’s College of New Scholars, Artists, and Scientists, nationally recognizing his leadership and impact in Indigenous health. In 2024, he was awarded the David E. Hunt Award for Excellence in Graduate Education by the University of Toronto’s Ontario Institute for Studies in Education for his contributions to graduate student mentorship and training.

== Clinical Practice ==
Ansloos is a Registered Psychologist with the College of Psychologists of Ontario (2018–present). He has previously held registration with the College of Psychologists of British Columbia (now called the College of Health and Care Professionals of British Columbia) and held licensure as a Clinical Psychologist (Health Service Provider) with the Massachusetts Board of Registration of Psychologists.

== Creative Works ==
Ansloos is also a children's book author. He co-wrote the award-winning children's book Thunder and the Noise Storms with Shezza Ansloos (his mother). The book was published in 2021 by Annick Press and has received numerous accolades, including being named a Cooperative Children's Book Center Choice 2022 (joint winner), TD Summer Reading Club 2023 (joint winner), a nominee for the Blue Spruce Award 2021, and selected for the CBC Reads children’s book category in 2022.

== Advocacy ==
Ansloos has contributed to public policy discussions on healthcare and economic justice in Canadian politics. He was previously a board member and fellow of the Broadbent Institute, where he co-authored reports on universal mental healthcare, public healthcare expansion, and economic disparities in Canada's COVID-19 pandemic response.

== Background ==
Ansloos was born on January 16, 1987, in Winnipeg, Manitoba. He is a registered status member of Fisher River Cree Nation in Manitoba and is of mixed Cree and English descent.

== Selected publications ==
- Ansloos, J. P. (2017). The medicine of peace: Indigenous youth decolonizing healing and resisting violence. Fernwood Publishing.
- Ansloos, J. (2018). "Rethinking indigenous suicide". International Journal of Indigenous Health. 13 (2): 8–28. doi:10.32799/ijih.v13i2.32061.
- Ansloos, J.; Stewart, S.; Fellner, K.; Goodwill, A.; Graham, H.; McCormick, R.; Harder, H.; Mushquash, C. (2019). "Indigenous peoples and professional training in psychology in Canada". Canadian Psychology / Psychologie Canadienne. 60 (4): 265–280. doi:10.1037/cap0000189.
