= Urban evolution =

Urban evolution refers to the heritable genetic changes of populations in response to urban development and anthropogenic activities in urban areas. Urban evolution can be caused by non-random mating, mutation, genetic drift, gene flow, or evolution by natural selection. In the context of Earth's living history, rapid urbanization is a relatively recent phenomenon, yet biologists have already observed evolutionary change in numerous species compared to their rural counterparts on a relatively short timescale.

Strong selection pressures due to urbanization play a big role in this process. Urbanization introduces distinct challenges such as altered microclimates, pollution, habitat fragmentation, and differential resource availability. These changed environmental conditions exert unique selection pressures on their inhabitants, leading to physiological and behavioral adaptations in city-dwelling plant and animal species. However, there is also discussion on whether some of these emerging traits are truly a consequence of genetic adaptation, or examples of phenotypic plasticity. There is also a significant change in species composition between rural and urban ecosystems.

Understanding how anthropogenic activity can influence the traits of other living beings can help humans better understand their effect on the environment, particularly as cities continue to grow. Shared aspects of cities worldwide give ample opportunity for scientists to study the specific evolutionary responses in these rapidly changed landscapes independently. How certain organisms adapt to urban environments while others cannot gives a live perspective on rapid evolution.

== Urbanization ==
With urban growth, the urban-rural gradient has seen a large shift in distribution of humans, moving from low density to very high density within the last millennia. This has brought a large change to environments as well as societies.

Urbanization transforms natural habitats into completely altered living spaces that sustain large human populations. Increasing congregation of humans accompanies the expansion of infrastructure, industry and housing. Natural vegetation and soil are mostly replaced or covered by dense grey materials. Urbanized areas continue to expand both in size and number globally; in 2018, the United Nations estimated that 68% of people globally will live in ever-expanding urban areas by 2050.

== Urban evolution selective agents ==
Urbanization intensifies diverse stressors spatiotemporally such that they can act in concert to cause rapid evolutionary consequences such as extinction, maladaptation, or adaptation. Three factors have come to the forefront as the main evolutionary influencers in urban areas: the urban microclimate, pollution, and urban habitat fragmentation. These influence the processes that drive evolution, such as natural and sexual selection, mutation, gene flow and genetic drift.

=== Urban microclimate ===
A microclimate is defined as any area where the climate differs from the surrounding area. Modifications of the landscape and other abiotic factors contribute to a changed climate in urban areas. The use of impervious dark surfaces which retain and reflect heat, and human generated heat energy lead to an urban heat island in the center of cities, where the temperature is increased significantly. A large urban microclimate does not only affect temperature, but also rainfall, snowfall, air pressure and wind, the concentration of polluted air, and how long that air remains in the city.

These climatological transformations increase selection pressure on species living in urban areas, driving evolutionary changes. Certain species have shown to be adapting to the urban microclimate.

For example, a research study focused on urban thermal heterogeneity, which can lead to the formation of Urban heat islands, shows how variations in temperature due to urbanization significantly affects Feral pigeons (Columba livia) causing changes in their metabolic processes and oxidative stress levels. Specifically, pigeons in hotter areas showed elevated oxidative stress, suggesting that urban heat could compromise their health.

=== Urban pollution ===
Many species have evolved over macroevolutionary timescales by adapting in response to the presence of toxins in the environment of the planet. Human activities, including urbanization, have greatly increased selection pressures due to pollution of the environment, climate change, ocean acidification, and other stressors. Species in urban settings must deal with higher concentrations of contaminants than naturally would occur.

There are two main forms of pollution which lead to selective pressures: energy or chemical substances. Energy pollution can come in the form of artificial lighting, sounds, thermal changes, radioactive contamination and electromagnetic waves. Chemical pollution leads to the contamination of the atmosphere, the soil, water and food. All these polluting factors pose direct and indirect challenges to species inhabiting urban areas, altering species' behavior and/or physiology, which in turn can lead to evolutionary changes.

Air pollution and soil pollution have significant physiological impacts on both wildlife and plants. For urban animals, exposure to pollutants often results in respiratory issues, neurological damage, and skin irritations. Over time, animals may adapt to these stressors through changes in their physiological systems, such as increased lung capacity or more efficient detoxification mechanisms to cope with pollutants. However, the severity of these adaptations varies across species, with some developing resilience while others face diminished health. The peppered moth (Biston betularia) is a classic example of industrial melanism, where moth populations adapted to increased soot and pollutants by evolving darker coloration, which allowed them to better blend into the soot-darkened trees during the industrial revolution.

For plants, long-term exposure to pollutants like ozone can impair vital structures on their leaves, disrupting gas exchange and reducing growth. Some plants adapt by closing their stomata or producing antioxidants to mitigate the damage, while others are less equipped to cope and show signs of decline. Pollution also alters soil chemistry, affecting nutrient availability and further stressing plant growth. These physiological changes to both flora and fauna influence urban ecosystems, determining which species can survive and reproduce in polluted environments.

A study on Great tits (Parus major) also found that air pollutants, in combination with local tree composition and temperature, affect their nestling physiology. Specifically, antioxidant capacity and fatty acid composition in these birds were influenced by the surrounding environmental conditions, including pollution levels.

Water pollution is another major concern, to which species living in aquatic habitats, such as fish, can evolve resistance to pollutants. The Atlantic killifish (Fundulus heteroclitus) has evolved to resist toxic pollutants like polychlorinated biphenyls (PCBs), commonly found in polluted urban waters. This resistance is thought to be the result of mutations that allow the fish to tolerate high levels of chemicals that would otherwise be lethal.

Noise pollution, often resulting from traffic, construction, and industrial activities, is another form of energy pollution that significantly affects urban species. Prolonged exposure to high noise levels can interfere with animals' communication, navigation, feeding behaviors, and stress response mechanisms. In particular, birds are sensitive to noise pollution, as it disrupts their ability to communicate using signals, such as calls from potential mates or warnings of predators. This disruption can lead to changes in behavior, reproduction, and survival.

=== Urban habitat fragmentation ===
The fragmentation of previously intact natural habitats into smaller pockets which can still sustain organisms leads to selection and adaptation of species. These new urban patches, often called urban green spaces, come in all shapes and sizes ranging from parks, gardens, plants on balconies, to the breaks in pavement and ledges on buildings. The diversity in habitats leads to adaptation of local organisms to their own niche. And contrary to popular belief, there is higher biodiversity in urban areas than previously believed. This is due to the numerous microhabitats. These remnants of wild vegetation or artificially created habitats with often exotic plants and animals all support different kinds of species, which leads to pockets of diversity inside cities.

With habitat fragmentation also comes genetic fragmentation; genetic drift and inbreeding within small isolated populations results in low genetic variation in the gene pool. Low genetic variation is generally seen as bad for chances of survival. This is why probably some species aren't able to sustain themselves in the fragmented environments of urban areas.

Urban environments create new selection pressures for species, leading to rapid adaptations. Species may experience changes in behavior, morphology, or physiology due to altered resources, human-induced pollution, and fragmented habitats. For instance, city-dwelling animals like birds may evolve shorter wings to better navigate between buildings, or insects might develop resistance to pesticides commonly used in urban settings. Urban heat islands are another factor contributing to urban evolution. Cities tend to be warmer than surrounding rural areas, causing species to adapt to higher temperatures. some insects have been observed to become more heat-tolerant over time. Pollution and light exposure also play a significant role. Many species must adapt to high levels of pollution in cities or artificial light that disrupts their natural behaviors. example birds in cities often start singing earlier in the morning due to the prevalence of artificial lighting, which can affect their mating patterns. Fragmentation of habitats has led to the creation of micro-habitats within cities, which act as isolated evolutionary zones. Species in these fragmented areas often experience unique evolutionary pressures, leading to genetic drift and divergence from rural populations.

In one study, researchers examined how early life experiences, particularly adverse conditions, influence behavior in European starlings (Sturnus vulgaris). The study specifically explored how early life adversity—such as nutritional stress or challenging environmental conditions—may trigger adaptive behaviors in the starlings, including increased foraging and actively seeking out information later in life. The birds were found to be more efficient at locating food and gathering relevant information from their surroundings, suggesting that early adversity may encourage greater exploration and resource acquisition strategies as an adaptive response to uncertainty.

Their findings imply that animals experiencing early adversity in fragmented environments may develop enhanced abilities to locate and exploit scattered resources. This may help explain why some species, such as starlings, are able to persist and even thrive in urban settings despite habitat degradation. Fragmented urban habitats tend to be more unpredictable, with food sources often patchy and habitats divided. In such environments, animals that have faced early adversity may become more adept at navigating these challenges. Just as the starlings in the study displayed increased cognitive flexibility in their foraging and information-gathering behaviors, animals in urban ecosystems may also adopt similar strategies to cope with the effects of habitat fragmentation. Cognitive flexibility enables animals to adapt to fluctuating conditions, such as changes in food availability or alterations to shelter and nesting sites, which are common in urbanized landscapes.

=== Resource availability ===
Urbanization often leads to changes in the availability and distribution of food, water, and shelter, prompting behavioral, physiological, and morphological adaptations in species that can exploit new resource environments. Resource availability also acts as a selective force in urban evolution, influencing the survival and reproductive success of species living in cities. Urban areas offer a distinctive array of resources, including food sources like garbage, human waste, and crops, often differing in quantity and quality from those found in natural habitats. These variations can create evolutionary pressures on local populations. This can be seen in the New York City white-footed mice (Peromyscus leucopus) as its tooth rows adapt a structure that can chew on the foods and resources available.

Urban Raccoons (Procyon lotor) have also adapted to urban environments by exploiting food sources like garbage, pet food, and bird feeders. These animals have developed more adaptable foraging behaviors and are known to thrive in cities due to the abundance of easily accessible food. A recent study reveals the urban raccoons ability to solve foraging challenges, demonstrating innovative problem-solving skills. The research showed that raccoons use puzzle boxes with different difficulty levels to obtain food, with some raccoons learning to solve increasingly complex tasks. The study found that younger raccoons, who were more willing to take risks, were more successful at solving the puzzles. This study shows how raccoons adapt to urban environments through learning and behavioral flexibility, and suggests that finding ways to find resources drive these cognitive adaptations.

== Examples of urban evolution ==
=== Adaptation and natural selection ===
The urban environment imposes different selection pressures than the typical natural setting. These stressors elicit phenotypic changes in populations of organisms which may be due to phenotypic plasticity—the ability of individual organisms to express different phenotypes from the same genotype as a result of exposure to different environmental conditions—or actual genetic changes.

Mutations are genotypic changes that may result in changes in phenotype, altering the observable traits of an organism and thus potentially its interactions or relationship with its environment. Mutations produce genetic variation which can be acted upon by evolutionary processes such as natural selection. For evolution to occur through natural selection, there must be genetic variation within a population, differential survival as a consequence of the genetic variation, and selective pressure from the environment towards particular desirable or undesirable traits.

Thus, in considering the examples of urban evolution, observed phenotypic divergences or differences in response to urbanization have to be genetically based and increase fitness in that particular environment to be tagged as evolution and adaptation, respectively. Hence, it will be appropriate to consider neutral, or non-adaptive, and adaptive urban evolution, with the later needing to be sufficiently proven.

Although there is widespread agreement that adaptation is occurring in urban populations, there are few completely proven examples of evolution – almost all are cases of selection, reasoned speculation connecting to adaptive benefit, but insufficient evidence of genetically based, actual adaptive phenotype. At this time the following examples are sufficiently demonstrated:

- Multiple Atlantic killifish (Fundulus heteroclitus) populations have independently evolved pollution-resistant characteristics such as whole-body chemical tolerance and aryl hydrocarbon receptors. Bioaccumulating polychlorinated biphenyl (PCB) chemicals are often disposed of into the water of urban estuary habitats and cause developmental defects in many vertebrates. The killifish evolved resistance to model pollutant PCB-126. Quantitative trait locus mapping indicated that genes responsible for aryl hydrocarbon receptor signaling may potentially be responsible for this chemical resistance, with resistant F.heteroclitus populations exhibiting a desensitized signaling pathway. This genetic change was also determined to be heritable. Killifish were consequently found to be 8,000 times more resistant to environmental pollutants than other species of fish.
- The peppered moth is an example of industrial melanism. These moths changed color from light to dark due to anthropogenic air pollution during the industrial revolution. With soot release as a consequence of coal burning, the urban trees that the moths would reside on became darker. Additionally, the lichens died as well, leaving little cover for the moths to camouflage. The black melanism phenotype frequency saw a rise during the time of heavy air pollution and a fall after cleaner air became more normal again in cities.
- Acorn ants (Temnothorax curvispinosus) adapt to tolerate increased urban temperatures. As a consequence of abundant heat-retaining manmade materials such as concrete and steel in urban environments, cities tend to exhibit a heat island effect. Compared to rural populations, urban populations of T.curvispinosus were more tolerating of a rapid rate of temperature increase, and higher temperatures overall.
- The water flea (Daphnia magna) has adapted to urban settings and displays the ability to better tolerate heat. Likely as a consequence of the urban heat island and thus warmer pond water, water fleas have also evolved even more towards a "fast living" pace of life - they mature faster, reproduce quicker, produce more offspring, are smaller, and have a higher maximum population growth rate than rural populations of the same species.
- Ragweed (Ambrosia artemisiifolia) has very divergent flowering phenology. Urban A.artemisiifolia also exhibit a greater variance in terms of plant height than rural members of the species.
- Holy hawksbeard (Crepis sancta) develops larger size, later flowering, delayed senescence, higher photosynthetic capacity, higher water use efficiency, and higher leaf nitrogen in urban areas.

Other claimed examples of adaptation indicative of potential urban evolution include:

- Genome sequencing of New York City brown rats (Rattus norvegicus) has revealed significant selective sweeps at loci for metabolic, nervous, locomotive, and diet-related genes. These sweeps were also unique to the New York City population. This indicates not only that populations are undergoing unique genetic changes in urban environments, but also that these mutations are beneficial in their environment, and increasing in frequency. This consequently demonstrates the processes of adaptation and urban evolution.
- Humans often attempt to curb rodent populations through the use of rodenticides. Anticoagulant-class rodenticides alter the rate of blood coagulation through its effects on the vitamin K reductase (VKOR) enzyme. Sequencing of the associated VKOR gene, VKORC1, in rat and mice species indicated mutations in said gene. There was also observed resistance to the rodenticides in these mice. Presence of mutation and consequential resistance to these rodenticides indicate genetic change and resulting adaptation to the anthropogenic chemical.
- The guppy (Poecilia reticulata) in urban environments exhibited reduced color expression and lower sperm load. In these fish, expression of bright colors is typically used to attract mates and is therefore typically vulnerable to sexual selection. Such "attractive" traits and traits that otherwise maximize fertilization potential are favored by sexual selection. However, both of these sexually favorable traits were less expressed in urban populations. This was hypothesized to be a consequence of urban pollution. Pollution alters the underwater visibility of the bright colors, making them costly to exhibit without the benefit of being noticeable to a mate. The polluted urban waters are harsher and therefore individuals may need to prioritize investment in traits for survival rather than reproduction, potentially resulting in lower sperm load. Sexual selection was weaker in urban streams than in rural streams.
- New York City white-footed mice (Peromyscus leucopus) had shorter upper and lower tooth rows relative to their rural counterparts. Longer tooth rows are advantageous for eating low-quality foods, which typically require more chewing. Urban mice having shorter tooth rows consequently implies that they consume softer food or food of higher quality due to differential availability of nutritional food in urban and rural environments.
- House finches (Carpodacus mexicanus) in urban environments showed divergence from their rural counterparts in terms of bill morphology and bite force. House finches in urban areas rely on different food sources than those in rural desert areas - urban house finches eat more sunflower seeds from bird feeders, which are larger and harder than the non-anthropogenic seeds found naturally occurring in the native desert habitat that rural finches continue to reside in. Thus, urban house finches have evolved longer and wider beaks compared to the shorter beaks of desert house finches. It was discovered that the urban finches express bone morphogenetic proteins at larger doses and earlier on in their development, a likely biochemical cause to their larger beaks.
- The common blackbird (Turdus merula) may be the first example of actual speciation by urban evolution, due to the urban heat island and food abundance the urban blackbird has become non-migratory in urban areas. The birds also sing higher and at different times, and they breed earlier than their rural counterparts which leads to sexual selection and a separated gene pool. Natural behavioral differences have also formed between urban and rural birds.
- Urban Anole lizards (Anolis) have evolved longer limbs and more lamellae compared with anolis lizards from forest habitats. This because the lizards can navigate the artificial building materials used in cities better.
- The urban Hawksbeard plant (Crepis) has evolved a higher percentage of heavier nondispersing seeds compared to rural hawksbeard plants, because habitat fragmentation leads to a lower chance of dispersing seeds to settle.
- White clover (Trifolium repens) has repeatedly adapted to urban environments on a global scale due to genetic changes in a heritable antiherbivore defense trait (hydrogen cyanide) in response to urban-rural changes in drought stress, vegetation and winter temperatures.
- The London Underground mosquito (Culex pipiens f. molestus), a striking example of urban adaptation, had been used as an iconic example of urban evolution and speciation as well. While genetic studies showed that it probably evolved in human settlements in southern Europe or the Middle East a few thousand years ago. Its vernacular name and studies of genetic differentiation in London introduced a popular misconception that molestus originated in the London Underground less than 100 years ago, representing one of the most rapid events of adaptation and speciation. However, recent meta-analysis and large-scale genomic study have confirmed that molestus evolved above ground in the Middle East ~2000 years ago, likely adapting to ancient human agricultural societies. Molestus then colonized below ground habitats like subways and basements in northern Europe (and subsequently across the globe) as humans have developed modern cities more recently. The adaptive traits that evolved in the ancient times have become useful for them to colonize more recent urban environments, providing a striking example of exaptation.
- Urban Peromyscus leucopus, microtus pennylvanicus, Eptesicus fuscus, and Sorex cinereus all showed a statistically significant larger cranial capacity relative to rural members of the same respective species. An increased cranial size may be associated with development of novel behaviors to cope with the new stresses of the urban environment. However, it is not entirely certain whether this is an example of true evolution or behavioral plasticity - no sustained cranial capacity increase over time was observed. In fact, the cranial size decreased over time in urban populations.
- Urban populations of the red fox have evolved a skull that is morphologically different from wild and rural population.

While these examples show genetic change and/or adaptation, they are not completely proven to be examples of evolution, whether due to insufficient evidence of heritability, or being a possible result of something else, such as plasticity, or because of insufficient evidence.

Some interesting cases of possible adaptation which remain insufficiently proven are:

- Bobcats (Lynx rufus) in Los Angeles, CA, USA were selected for immune genetics loci by an epidemic of mange there, however Serieys et al. 2014 does not provide proof of resistant phenotype.
- Water dragon lizards (Intellagama lesueurii) in Brisbane, Australia do show divergence. Littleford-Colquhoun et al. 2017 find divergence of both morphology and genetics, but remind readers that they have not demonstrated that this is adaptive.

In one case selection is widely expected to occur and yet is not found:

- Coyotes (Canis latrans) in New York City, USA show no immune selection in the work of DeCandia et al. 2019.

== Genetic drift and gene flow ==
Evolution is not strictly the result of natural selection and beneficial adaptation. Evolution may also result from genetic drift due to population bottlenecks. In a population bottleneck, the population size is reduced randomly and significantly; there is no selection and therefore random alleles may be kept whereas others decreased in the population. The bottlenecked population may thus show different allele frequencies and phenotypic frequencies than the original population.

A population bottleneck may arise from anthropogenic factors common in urban areas, such as habitat fragmentation from abundant infrastructure. Habitat fragmentation may also lead to reduction in gene flow, further isolating populations of the same species from one another. Cities have been found to both increase genetic drift and decrease gene flow. In an overview of 167 different studies, over 90% indicated a correlation between genetic drift, gene flow, and urbanization. This genetic isolation of urban populations can result in divergence from the original and rural populations of the same species, leading to nonadaptive evolution.

An example of nonadaptive change related to genetic drift and gene flow is the burrowing owl (Athene cunicularia) in urban Argentina. Each of the three studied cities was independently colonized by a unique population of owls, and there was minimal gene flow between urban owls and those of nearby rural populations. Moreover, there was no gene flow between the owl populations of the three different cities. Gene sequencing revealed that there was less variation present in single nucleotide polymorphisms (SNPS) in urban populations relative to rural populations, and the different cities had different rare SNPS. The different urban populations were genetically isolated from each other and exhibited genetic divergence when compared to both other urban populations and rural populations. This was also seen in New York City white-footed mice. Urbanization limited their habitat to predominantly city parks, and the independent city park populations were genetically discrete.

== Phenotypic plasticity ==
When species show apparent adaptation to an urban or other environment, that adaptation is not necessarily a consequence of evolution, or even genetic change. One genotype may be able to produce various phenotypes adaptive to different environmental conditions. In other words, divergent observable traits may arise from one set of genes and therefore, genetic change did not occur to produce these traits, and evolution did not occur. However, genetic evolution, phenotypic plasticity, and even other factors such as learning may all contribute in varying degrees to form the apparent phenotypic difference.

For example, when 3,768 bird species were assessed in multiple urban environments, it was determined that urban species are generally smaller in size, occupy less specific niches, live longer, have more eggs, and are less aggressive in defending territory. While there are statistically significant differences between the urban and rural birds of various species, this cannot be assumed to be purely genetic, especially since this study did not explore the potential genetic background of the phenotypic variations.

Another study examines how urbanization influences plant responses to herbivory, using the common dandelion (Taraxacum officinale) along an urbanization gradient. Plants from different urban, suburban, and rural areas were raised under similar conditions and exposed to herbivory (locust grazing). While all plants increased their resistance to herbivores with repeated exposure, urban plants showed reduced early seed production compared to rural and suburban plants. This study suggests that urbanization affects plant defenses and fitness, with urban populations showing different reaction norms in response to herbivory.

A more specific example of phenotypic plasticity is behavioral plasticity, which is often observed in urban areas. In the dark-eyed junco (Junco hyemalis), it was determined that phenotypic plasticity was in part responsible for the differential nesting behaviors of urban dwellers. In order to adapt to the noise pollution abundantly present in urbanized areas, city-dwelling dark-eyed junco birds utilized higher frequency songs to communicate with one another relative to rural birds. It was determined that even in experimental conditions the birds from urbanized areas continued to sing at louder frequencies even without noise present. While this could have been indicative of a genetic basis and thus evolution, it was also observed that prior to capture, birds would exhibit sharing of song with one another. The higher frequency song in the captured experimental population could have therefore been a result of learning from other birds. However, the birds also show significant genetic variation in multiple traits related to reproductive and endocrine systems. This example shows demonstrates the complex interrelation between genetic change, phenotypic and behavioral plasticity, adaptation, and learning in the formation of a novel or changed phenotype.

== Species composition ==
As a region urbanizes the species composition generally undergoes change. The new conditions associated with urban infrastructure, air and noise pollution, habitat fragmentation, differential food availability, humans and cars, and so on may be difficult for certain species to adapt to. In birds, for instance, rare species generally disappear in urban areas, with species that are more adaptable tend to dominate. This results in homogenization. In plants, urbanization reduces species richness and introduces homogeny. It also decreases the amount of pollinators, which may increase reproductive difficulty.
