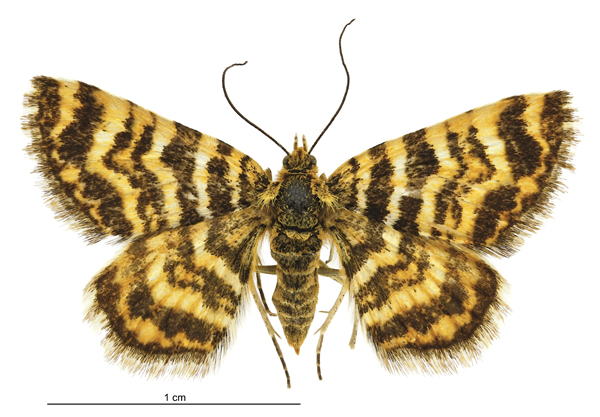
- Female
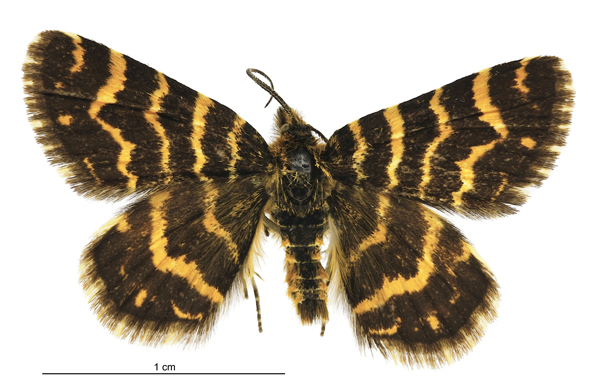
- Male

Scientific classification
- Kingdom: Animalia
- Phylum: Arthropoda
- Clade: Pancrustacea
- Class: Insecta
- Order: Lepidoptera
- Family: Geometridae
- Genus: Notoreas
- Species: N. isomoera

Binomial name
- Notoreas isomoera Prout, 1939

= Notoreas isomoera =

Species of moth

Notoreas isomoera is a species of moth in the family Geometridae. It is endemic to New Zealand.

== Taxonomy ==
This species was first described in 1939 by Louis Beethoven Prout using material collected at Ben Lomond near Queenstown (male holotype) and at The Obelisk in the Old Man Range / Kopuwai in Otago (female allotype) by George Howes. The genus Notoreas was reviewed in 1986 by R. C. Craw and the placement of this species within it was confirmed. However species within the genus Notoreas are currently regarded as being in need of revision. The holotype specimen is held at the Natural History Museum, London.

== Description ==
Prout described the species as follows:

22—23 mm. Very near isoleuca, so determined in the Howes collection. Pectinations of ♂︎ slightly shorter. Markings broader, yellower; forewing with median line definitely and the postmedian rather acutely angled, subterminal extremely slight except anteriorly and as a dot in cellule 3; hindwing with similar distinctions.

== Distribution ==
This species is endemic to New Zealand. This species has been found in Otago.

== Life cycle and behaviour ==
The female moth lays her eggs within the flower buds of their host plant. When the larvae emerge from their eggs, they eat into the leaves or buds of their host, hiding from predators. Once they are large enough, they emerge to feed from the fresh growth of the plant. N. isomoera pupate in a loose cocoon on the ground under their host. N. isomoera are day-flying moths. They are low but fast flyers and constantly vibrate their wings to enable them to take off rapidly.

== Host species ==
The host plants for the larvae of N. isomoera are endemic species within the genera Pimelea and Kelleria.
