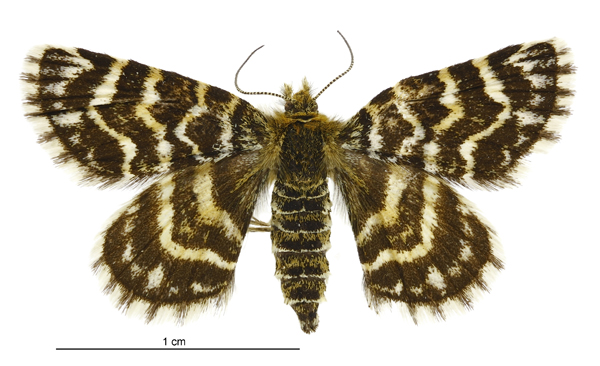
- Female
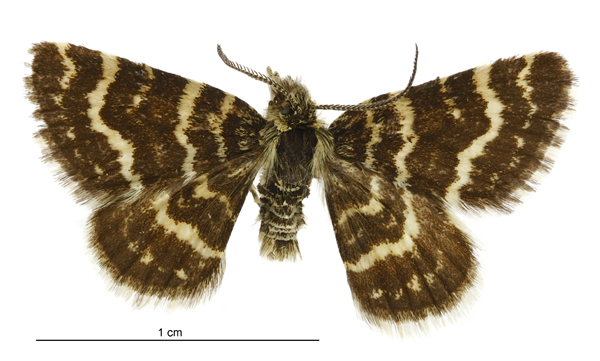
- Male

Scientific classification
- Kingdom: Animalia
- Phylum: Arthropoda
- Clade: Pancrustacea
- Class: Insecta
- Order: Lepidoptera
- Family: Geometridae
- Genus: Notoreas
- Species: N. hexaleuca

Binomial name
- Notoreas hexaleuca (Meyrick, 1914)

Synonyms
- Dasyuris hexaleuca Meyrick, 1914

= Notoreas hexaleuca =

Species of moth

Notoreas hexaleuca is a species of moth in the family Geometridae. This species is endemic to New Zealand.

== Taxonomy ==
This species was described by Edward Meyrick in 1914 using material collected at Ben Lomond in November by Alfred Philpott. As Meyrick only had a female specimen to work with, he provisionally placed the species in the genus Dasyuris and named it Dasyuris hexaleuca. After the discovery of a male of the species, Philpott placed the species within the genus Notoreas. George Hudson discussed N. hexaleuca in his book The Butterflies and Moths of New Zealand. Hudson went on to illustrate the species and discuss it further in his supplement to that work published in 1939.

The genus Notoreas was reviewed in 1986 by R. C. Craw and the placement of this species within it was confirmed. However species within the genus Notoreas are currently regarded as being in need of revision. The holotype specimen is held at the Natural History Museum, London.

== Description ==
Meyrick described the species as follows:

♀︎. 18 mm. Head and palpi white mixed with black. Thorax black with a white line on each side of back. Abdomen black sprinkled with white, segmental margins white. Forewings triangular, termen bowed, rather oblique; black; six ochreous-white transverse lines, first cloudy, ill defined, second and third nearly straight, third rather thick, fourth fine, angulated in disc, fifth thick, rather curved outwards in disc, sixth slender, curved, very near termen on lower half; a transverse ochreous-white mark in disc between third and fourth: cilia white barred with dark grey. Hindwings with termen rounded; blackish; basal area irrorated with white; three ochreous-white transverse streaks, first before middle, narrow, somewhat angulated in disc, with a distinct prominence from angle, second at 2/3, rather broad, bent in disc, third narrow, rather waved, curved, prae-terminal: cilia whitish, barred with dark grey on basal half, and with extreme base irregularly dark fuscous.

N. hexaleuca is similar in appearance to N. isoleuca and N. mechanitis. It can be distinguished from N. isoleuca as it has a less hairy thorax. N. hexaleuca also has visually different curved or straight lines on its forewings giving it a lighter appearance than N. isoleuca. N. hexaleuca can be distinguished from N. mechanitis as it is smaller in size and has longer pectinations on its antennae.

== Distribution ==
This species is endemic to New Zealand. Other than the type locality of Ben Lomond, N. hexaleuca has also been found at Flagstaff hill in Dunedin, at Mount Cook, at Skelmorlie Peak near Lake Te Anau, at Cluden Station near Tarras, in the Kakanui Mountains and at Mount Herbert.

== Biology and behaviour ==
This species is on the wing from November to March.

== Habitat and host species ==
This species prefers open hillside habitat and can be found at elevations of between 300 and 1000 metres. It has also been found in alpine wetland habitat at elevations of between 950 and 1500 metres. Larvae of this species have been found to feed on Kelleria species and in particular Kelleria paludosa.
