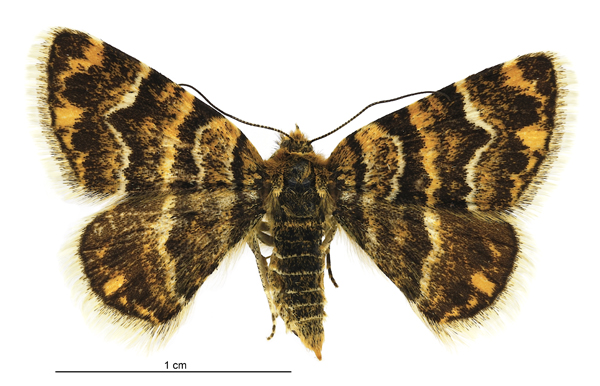
- Female

Scientific classification
- Kingdom: Animalia
- Phylum: Arthropoda
- Class: Insecta
- Order: Lepidoptera
- Family: Geometridae
- Genus: Notoreas
- Species: N. chioneres

Binomial name
- Notoreas chioneres Prout, 1939

= Notoreas chioneres =

Species of moth

Notoreas chioneres is a species of moth in the family Geometridae. This species is endemic to New Zealand.

== Taxonomy ==
This species was described by Louis Beethoven Prout in 1939 using material collected at The Obelisk in the Old Man Range / Kopuwai in Otago by George Howes. In 1986 Robin C. Craw reviewed the genus Notoreas and confirmed the inclusion of N. chioneres within it. The holotype specimen is held at the Natural History Museum, London.

== Description ==
This species has a wingspan of 23 mm and is similar in appearance to N. isoleuca.

== Distribution ==
This species is endemic to New Zealand. It is found in the mountain ranges of Central Otago as well as in the Kakanui Mountains at altitudes of between 1200 and 1500 metres.

== Biology and behaviour ==
This species is a day flying moth. It is on the wing from December to February. Adult moths, when settled, continue to vibrate their wings ensuring they are immediately ready to take off should they be disturbed. Although they prefer sunshine they will continue to fly when conditions are cloudy. They fly relatively low to the ground. When resting for long periods they adopt the posture of holding their wings together above their body.

== Habitat and host species ==
This species frequents alpine herbfield habitat. The larvae of this species feed on Kelleria villosa.
