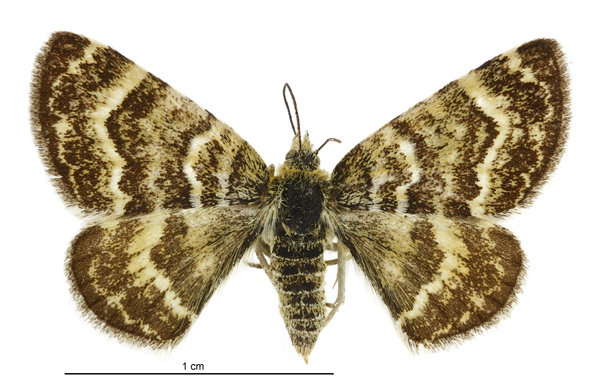
- Female
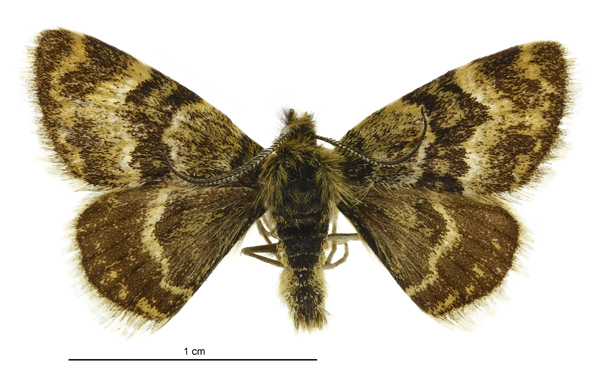
- Male

Scientific classification
- Kingdom: Animalia
- Phylum: Arthropoda
- Class: Insecta
- Order: Lepidoptera
- Family: Geometridae
- Genus: Notoreas
- Species: N. blax

Binomial name
- Notoreas blax Prout, 1939

= Notoreas blax =

Species of moth

Notoreas blax is a species of moth in the family Geometridae. This species is endemic to New Zealand. This moth frequents alpine habitat and can be found in the Canterbury and Otago regions.

== Taxonomy ==
This species was described by Louis Beethoven Prout in 1939 using material collected by George Howes at Bold Peak, Humboldt Range. In 1986 R. C. Craw reviewed the genus Notoreas and confirmed the inclusion of N. blax within it. The holotype specimen of this species is held at the Natural History Museum, London.

== Description ==
This species has a wingspan of between 20 – 22 mm and is similar in appearance to N. atmogramma. However it is paler on the upper side of its wings and is slightly less brown than a typical N. atmogramma.

== Distribution ==
This species is endemic to New Zealand. It is found in West Otago localities in the high alpine zone of mountain ranges. It has also been found in Aoraki / Mount Cook National Park also in the high alpine zone of that park.

== Biology and behaviour ==
This species is a day flying moth. It is on the wing in February. Adult moths, when settled, continue to vibrate their wings ensuring they are immediately ready to take off should they be disturbed. Although they prefer sunshine they will continue to fly when conditions are cloudy. They fly relatively low to the ground. When resting for long periods they adopt the posture of holding their wings together above their body.

== Habitat and host species ==
This species frequents alpine habitat. The larvae of this species feed on dwarf shrubs of Kelleria species including Kelleria croizatii.
