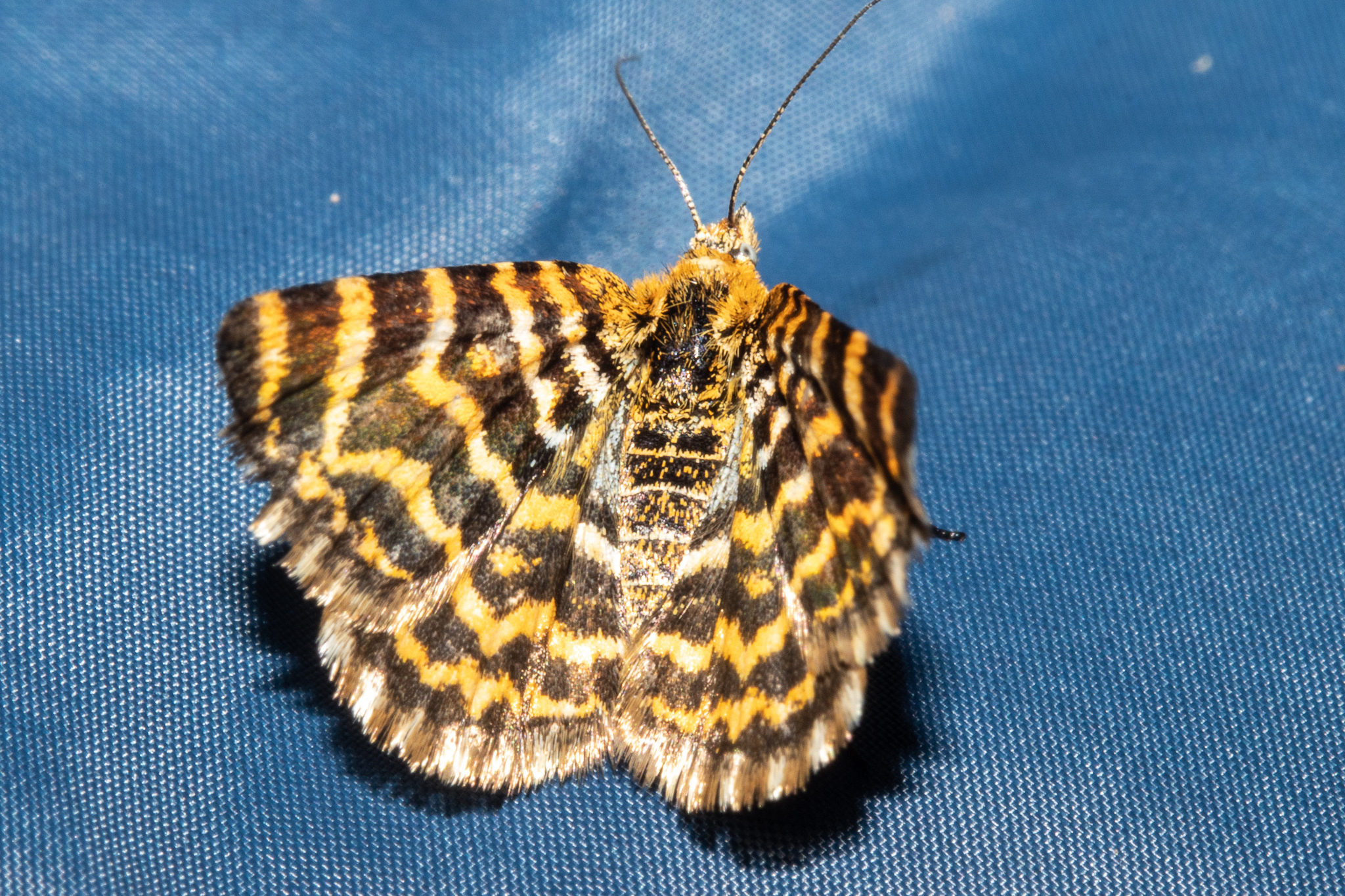
- Female
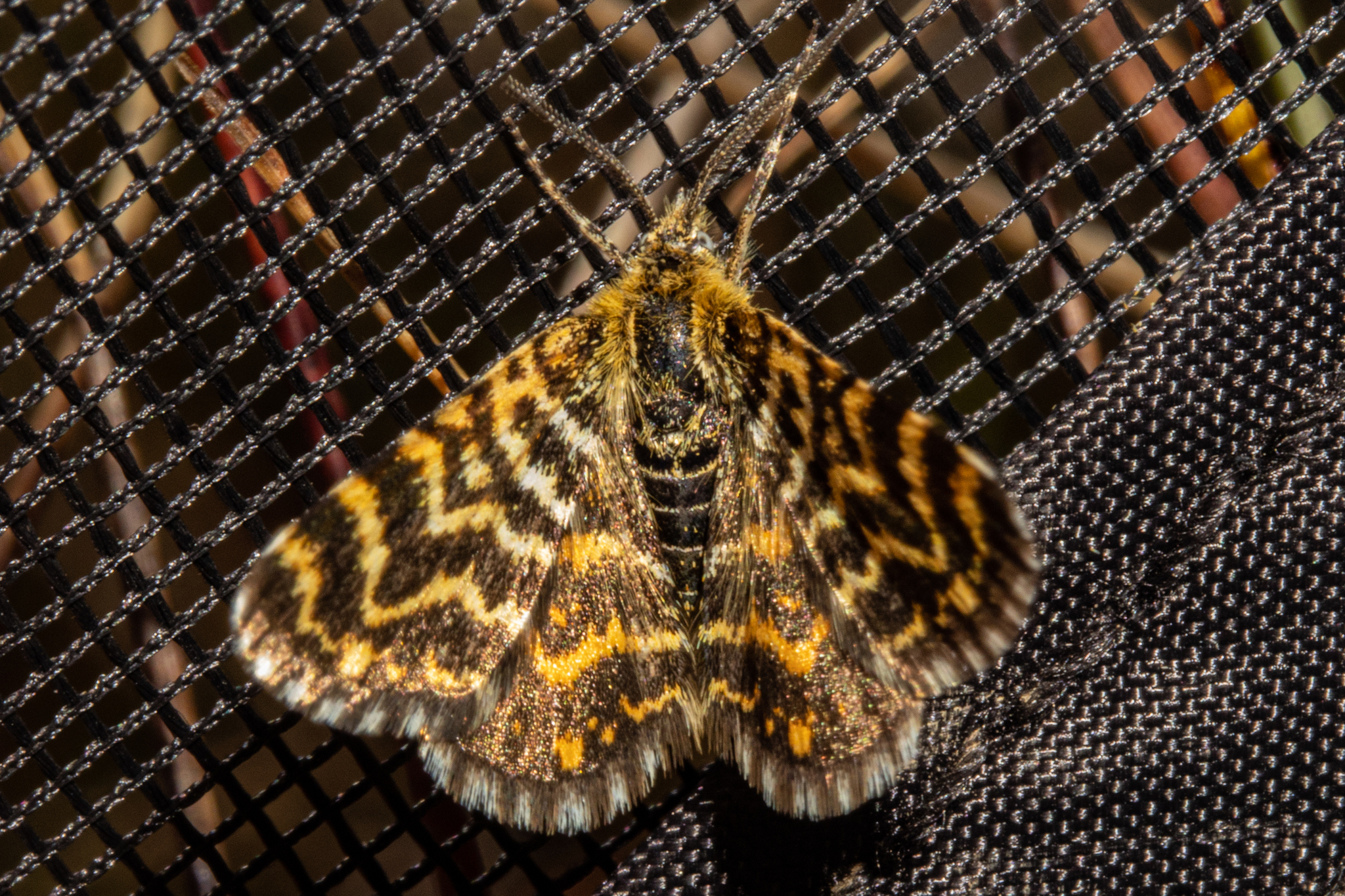
- Male

Scientific classification
- Kingdom: Animalia
- Phylum: Arthropoda
- Class: Insecta
- Order: Lepidoptera
- Family: Geometridae
- Genus: Notoreas
- Species: N. galaxias

Binomial name
- Notoreas galaxias Hudson, 1928

= Notoreas galaxias =

Species of moth

Notoreas galaxias is a species of moth in the family Geometridae. This species is endemic to New Zealand and has been observed in the southern half of the South Island. The species inhabits alpine herbfields and their larvae feed on species in the genera Kelleria and Drapetes. The adults are on the wing February to March.

== Taxonomy ==
This species was described by George Hudson in 1928 using material collected in February 1906 in the Old Man Range / Kopuwai in Central Otago at an elevation of about 1200 metres by J. H. Lewis. The genus Notoreas was reviewed in 1986 by R. C. Craw and the placement of this species within it was confirmed. However this species may be of dubious taxonomic status. The holotype specimen is held at the National Museum of New Zealand Te Papa Tongarewa.

== Description ==
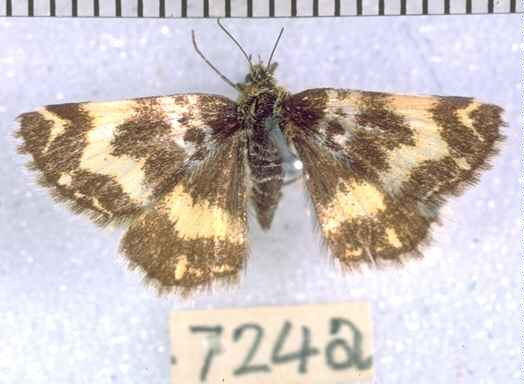
Notoreas galaxias female holotype

Hudson described the species as follows:

The expansion of the wings is about 1 inch. All the wings are brownish-black with broad creamy-white markings; there is a broad oblique band between the basal patch and median band containing a series of four small blackish blotches; the outer edge of the median band is boarded by a very broad creamy-white band strongly angulated outwards near the middle; a similar but broader and yellower band crosses the middle of the hind wings; there is a fine wavy subterminal line with a conspicuous whitish spot in the middle of the termen of both fore- and hind-wings. The head and body are blackish sprinkled with whitish scales; the palpi black with the base of the apical joint white. The markings on the underside resemble those above except that the area of creamy-white colouring is very much greater.

== Distribution ==
This species is endemic to New Zealand. It has been found in Central Otago at its type locality of Old Man Range as well as in the Dansey Ecological District and at Slate Basin and Symmetry Peak in the Eyre Ecological District.

== Biology and behaviour ==
This species is on the wing in February and March.

== Habitat and host species ==
Notoreas galaxias prefers herbfield alpine habitat. Larvae of this moth have been found to feed on species in the Kelleria and Drapetes genera.
