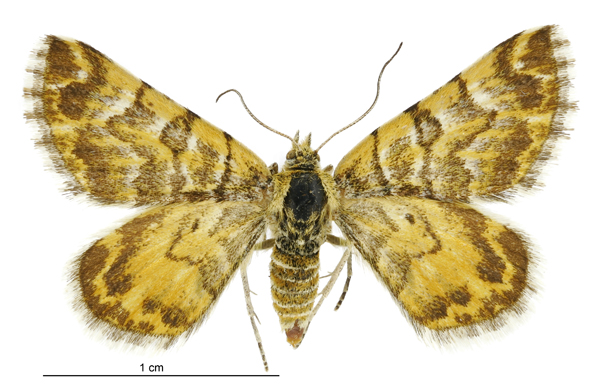
- Female
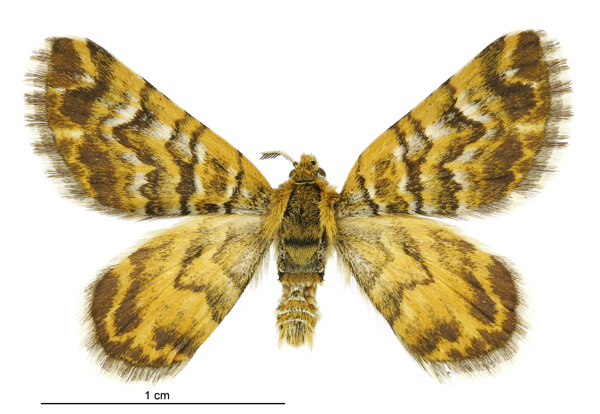
- Male

Conservation status
- Nationally Critical (NZ TCS)

Scientific classification
- Kingdom: Animalia
- Phylum: Arthropoda
- Class: Insecta
- Order: Lepidoptera
- Family: Geometridae
- Genus: Notoreas
- Species: N. edwardsi

Binomial name
- Notoreas edwardsi Patrick & Hoare, 2010

= Notoreas edwardsi =

Species of moth

Notoreas edwardsi is a species of moth in the family Geometridae. It is endemic to New Zealand. This species has been classified as Nationally Critical by the Department of Conservation.

== Taxonomy ==
This species was first described in 2010 by Brian Patrick and Robert J.B. Hoare. It was named in honour of Eric Edwards.

== Description ==
N. edwardsi larvae start off life green in colour but quickly change to brown. As they mature their colour changes again to pink purple with white lines running side to side on their body.

Adult moths of this species have pallid orange and white transverse markings on their forewings with orange and black-marked hindwings. N. edwardsi is similar in appearance to its close relations N. elegans and N. casanova.

== Distribution ==
This species is endemic to New Zealand. It only occurs at Big Sandhill, Mission Bay on Stewart Island.

== Life cycle and behaviour ==
This species has only been seen in its natural habitat in December but it has been hypothesised that it may produce two broods in a season. The female moth lays her eggs within the flowers buds of their hostplant. When the larvae emerge from their eggs, they eat into the leaves or buds of their host, hiding from predators. Once they are large enough, they emerge to feed from the fresh growth of the plant. N. edwardsi pupate in a loose cocoon on the ground under their host. The species spends approximately 43 days in their cocoon before emerging as an adult. N. edwardsi are day flying moths. They are low but fast flyers and constantly vibrate their wings to enable them to take off rapidly.

== Host species ==
The host plant for the larvae of N. edwardsi is the endemic plant Pimelea lyallii.

== Conservation status ==
This moth is classified under the New Zealand Threat Classification system as being Nationally Critical.
