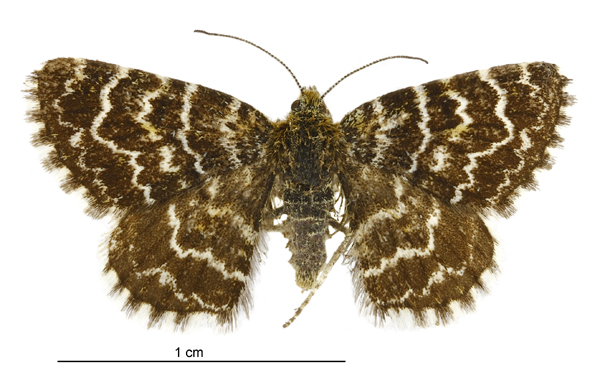
- Female

Scientific classification
- Kingdom: Animalia
- Phylum: Arthropoda
- Clade: Pancrustacea
- Class: Insecta
- Order: Lepidoptera
- Family: Geometridae
- Genus: Notoreas
- Species: N. ischnocyma

Binomial name
- Notoreas ischnocyma Meyrick, 1905

= Notoreas ischnocyma =

Species of moth

Notoreas ischnocyma is a species of moth in the family Geometridae. This species is endemic to New Zealand. This species is found in Canterbury and Otago.

== Taxonomy ==
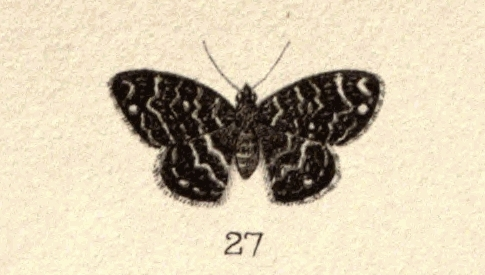
New Zealand Moths and Butterflies (1898) plate 8 fig 27

Notoreas ischnocyma was described by Edward Meyrick in 1905 using material collected at Castle Hill by George Hudson at an elevation of 1700 meters. Hudson had previously illustrated the specimen in his 1898 book New Zealand Moths and Butterflies (Macro-lepidoptera) but had included it within the species N. isoleuca. Hudson subsequently agreed with Meyrick and discussed and illustrated this species under the new species name in The Butterflies and Moths of New Zealand.

The genus Notoreas was reviewed in 1986 by R. C. Craw and the placement of this species within it was confirmed. However species within the genus Notoreas are currently regarded as being in need of revision. The holotype specimen is held at the Natural History Museum, London.

== Description ==
Meyrick described the species as follows:

♂︎. 20 mm. Head and thorax dark fuscous. Fore-wings triangular, costa slightly arched, termen obliquely rounded; dark fuscous, with some scattered yellow-whitish scales; subbasal, first, median, second, and subterminal lines slender, whitish, subbasal straight, first nearly straight, somewhat irregular, median indistinct, curved outwards in disc, second waved throughout, angulated in middle, indented beneath middle, subterminal irregularly waved: cilia white, basal half barred with dark fuscous. Hind-wings with ground colour, median, second, and subterminal lines, and cilia as in fore-wings.

N. ischnocyma can be distinguished from similar species by the slender second wavy line on its forewings.

== Distribution ==
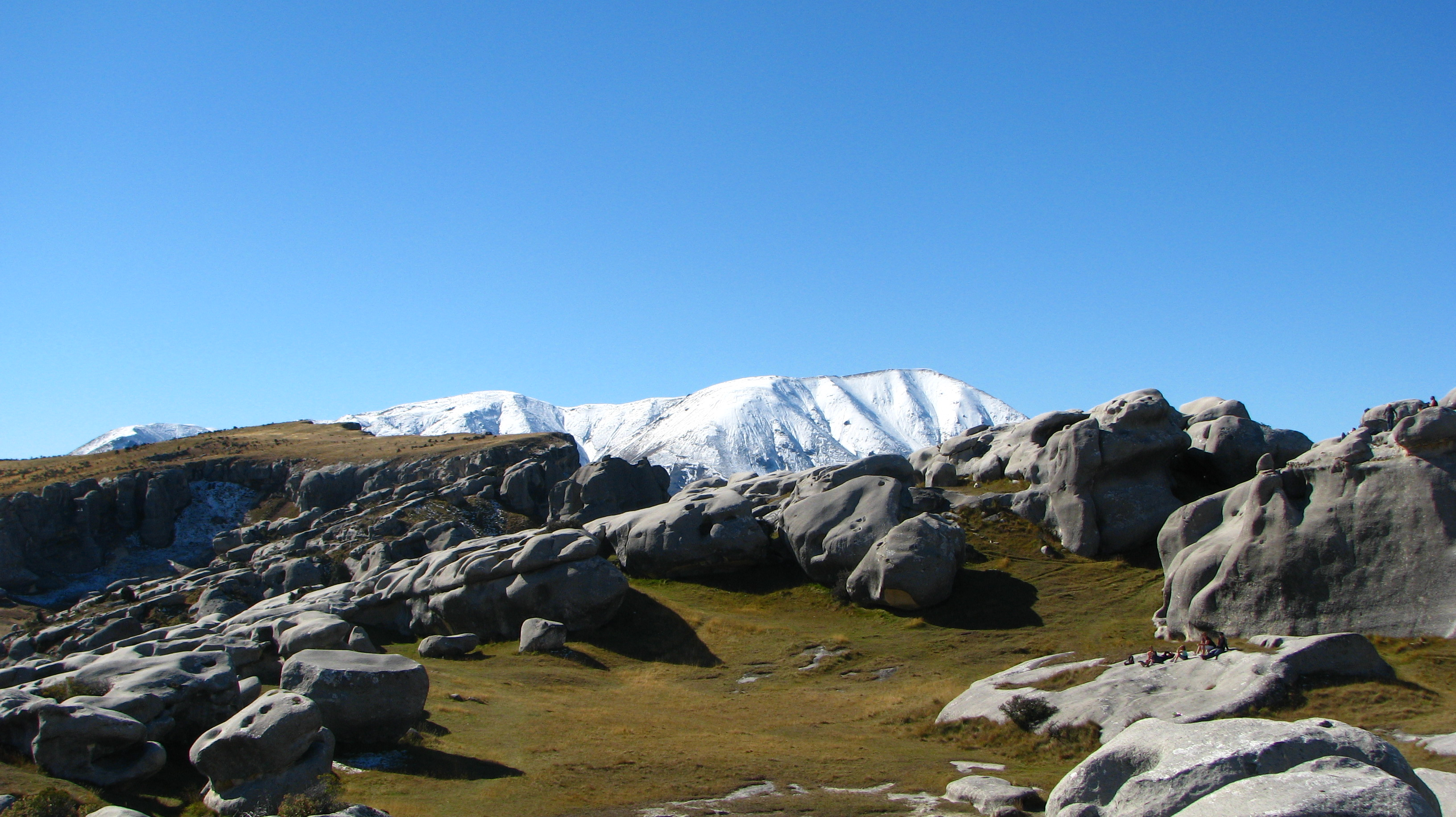
Castle Hill

This species is endemic to New Zealand. Other than the type locality of Castle Hill, N. ischnocyma has also been found in the Hawkdun and the Dansey ecological districts in Otago.

== Biology and behaviour ==
This day flying species is on the wing in December and January.

== Habitat and host species ==
This species inhabits high alpine stunted vegetation and herb fields. Larvae of species within the genus Notoreas feed exclusively on plants within the genera Pimelea and Kelleria.
