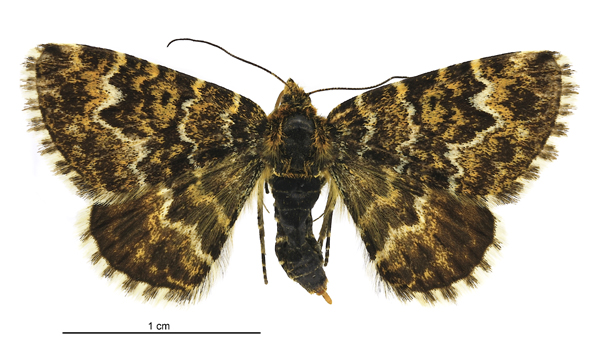
- Female

Scientific classification
- Kingdom: Animalia
- Phylum: Arthropoda
- Clade: Pancrustacea
- Class: Insecta
- Order: Lepidoptera
- Family: Geometridae
- Genus: Notoreas
- Species: N. arcuata

Binomial name
- Notoreas arcuata Philpott, 1921

= Notoreas arcuata =

Species of moth

Notoreas arcuata is a species of geometer moth endemic to New Zealand. This species if found in the South Island and has been observed in the Saint Arnaud Range, around Arthur's Pass and in the Oteake Conservation Park. Larvae feed on species in the genera Kelleria and Pimelea. Adults are on the wing from December to February.

== Taxonomy ==
This species was described by Alfred Philpott in 1921 using material collected in the Saint Arnaud Range by Mr R. Grimmett. George Hudson also discussed and illustrated this species in his book The Butterflies and Moths of New Zealand. J. S. Dugdale disputes that the illustration by Hudson in his book is of N. arcuata. The genus Notoreas was reviewed in 1986 by R. C. Craw and the placement of this species within it was confirmed. However species within the genus Notoreas are currently regarded as being in need of revision. The holotype specimen is held at the New Zealand Arthropod Collection.

== Description ==
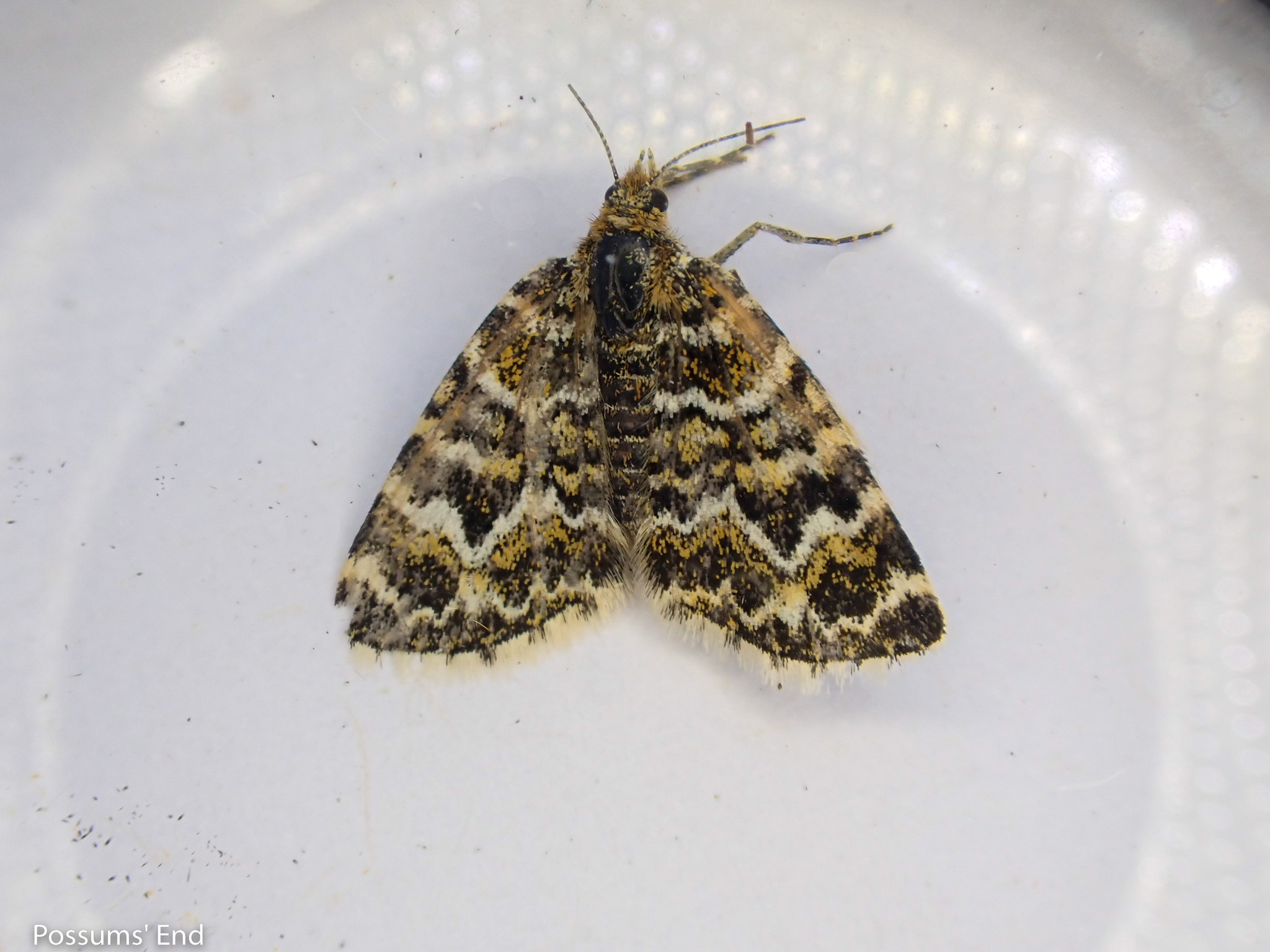
N. arcuata observed at Oteake Conservation Park

Philpott described the species as follows:

♀︎. 27 mm. Head, palpi, and thorax golden-yellow with some whitish scales. Antennae black, annulated with whitish. Abdomen black, segmental divisions whitish. Legs ochreous-whitish, strongly infuscated, tarsi annulated with ochreous. Forewings triangular, apex obtuse, termen bowed, oblique; dark fuscous, densely irrorated with yellow; lines narrow, white, sometimes yellow-tinged; a basal line anteriorly broadly margined with black, curved, distinct, slightly irregular; first line strongly curved, irregular, posteriorly margined with black; a black discal dot; an obscure irregular yellow median line; second line anteriorly broadly margined with black and followed by narrow yellow margin indented above and below middle; subterminal irregular, dilated on costa and at middle, yellowish above dorsum : cilia white, prominently barred with blackish. Hindwings and cilia as forewings but basal line absent and subterminal wholly yellow. Undersides reproducing markings of upper surfaces but with the lines much broader and the basal area of costa suffused with clear yellow.

== Distribution ==
This species is endemic to New Zealand. Other than its type locality of the Saint Arnaud Range, the species has also been found at Arthur's Pass and the Oteake Conservation Park.

== Biology and behaviour ==
This species is on the wing from December to February.

== Habitat and host species ==
Larvae in the genus Notoreas feed on woody plants in the genera Kelleria and Pimelea (daphe family).
