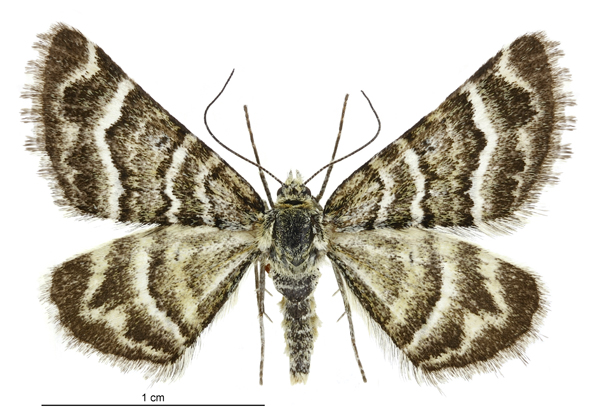
- Female
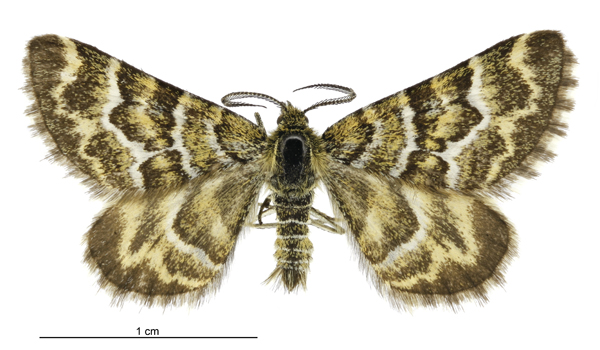
- Male

Scientific classification
- Kingdom: Animalia
- Phylum: Arthropoda
- Clade: Pancrustacea
- Class: Insecta
- Order: Lepidoptera
- Family: Geometridae
- Genus: Notoreas
- Species: N. paradelpha

Binomial name
- Notoreas paradelpha (Meyrick, 1883)

Synonyms
- Pasithea paradelpha Meyrick, 1883

= Notoreas paradelpha =

Species of moth

Notoreas paradelpha is a species of moth in the family Geometridae. It is endemic to New Zealand.

== Taxonomy ==
This species was first described in 1883 by Edward Meyrick using material collected by him on Ben Lomond near Lake Wakatipu in December. He named the species Pasithea paradelpha. In 1884 Meyrick went on to give a more detailed description of the species. In 1886 Meyrick renamed the genus to which he had previously assigned this species and placed it within the genus Notoreas. George Hudson discussed and illustrated this species both in his 1898 book New Zealand Moths and Butterflies (Macro-lepidoptera) and in his 1928 book The Butterflies and Moths of New Zealand.

The genus Notoreas was reviewed in 1986 by R. C. Craw and the placement of this species within it was confirmed. However species within the genus Notoreas are currently regarded as being in need of revision. The lectotype specimen is held at the Natural History Museum, London.

== Description ==
Meyrick described the species as follows:

Male. — 21-23 mm. Forewings moderate, costa straight, hindmargin rounded; dark fuscous, densely and finely strewn with yellowish and a few whitish scales; a curved cloudy whitish line towards base, anteriorly blackish-margined; a slightly bent whitish line at 1/3, posteriorly blackish-margined; sometimes a small blackish discal dot, and slender curved median line; a clearly marked white line beyond middle, anteriorly strongly blackish-margined, shortly and obtusely angulated in middle, and inner margin shortly toothed above and below middle; an irregular sinuate subdentate whitish-yellowish subterminal line: cilia with basal half dark grey, apical half sharply barred with dark fuscous and white. Hindwings somewhat elongate, hindmargin rounded; dark fuscous; basal half irrorated with pale yellowish; a very obscure curved whitish shade before middle; a well-defined strongly-curved white median line; a very irregular subdentate whitish-yellowish subterminal line; cilia as in forewings.

== Distribution ==
N. paradelpha is endemic to New Zealand. Along with its type locality of Ben Lomond, N. paradelpha has also been found on Mount Arthur, Arthur's Pass, the Hunter Mountains and at Obelisk Station and the Dansey Ecological District in Otago.

== Life cycle and behaviour ==
The female moth lays her eggs within the flower buds of their host plant. When the larvae emerge from their eggs, they eat into the leaves or buds of their host, hiding from predators. Once they are large enough, they emerge to feed from the fresh growth of the plant. N. paradelpha pupate in a loose cocoon on the ground under their host. N. paradelpha are day-flying moths. They are low but fast flyers and constantly vibrate their wings to enable them to take off rapidly.

Adults are on the wing from November to February.

== Habitat and host species ==
This moth species prefers to live in high alpine habitat and has been found amongst grass and in herbfields. The host plants for the larvae of N. paradelpha are the endemic species in the genera Kelleria and Pimelea including Pimelia oreophila.
