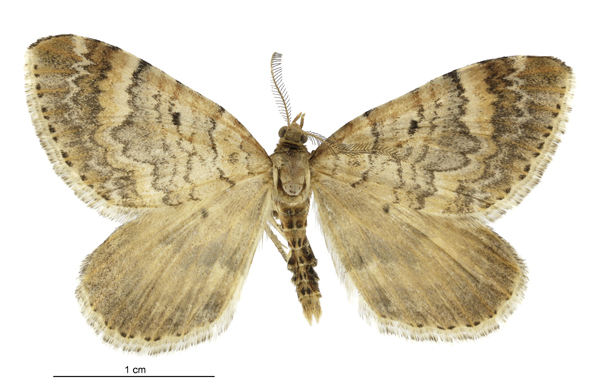
- Male

Scientific classification
- Kingdom: Animalia
- Phylum: Arthropoda
- Clade: Pancrustacea
- Class: Insecta
- Order: Lepidoptera
- Family: Geometridae
- Genus: Asaphodes
- Species: A. dionysias

Binomial name
- Asaphodes dionysias (Meyrick, 1907)

Synonyms
- Xanthorhoe dionysias Meyrick, 1907; Larentia dionysias (Meyrick, 1907)

= Asaphodes dionysias =

Species of moth

Asaphodes dionysias is a species of moth in the family Geometridae. This species is endemic to New Zealand and is only known from mountainous areas in Central Otago. It lives in open grassy mountainous habitat at altitudes up to 1750 m. It is also known to live in wetland habitat. The larvae of this species feed on native herbs. The adults of this species are on the wing in January and February. The adult female of the species has reduced wing size in comparison to the male.

== Taxonomy ==
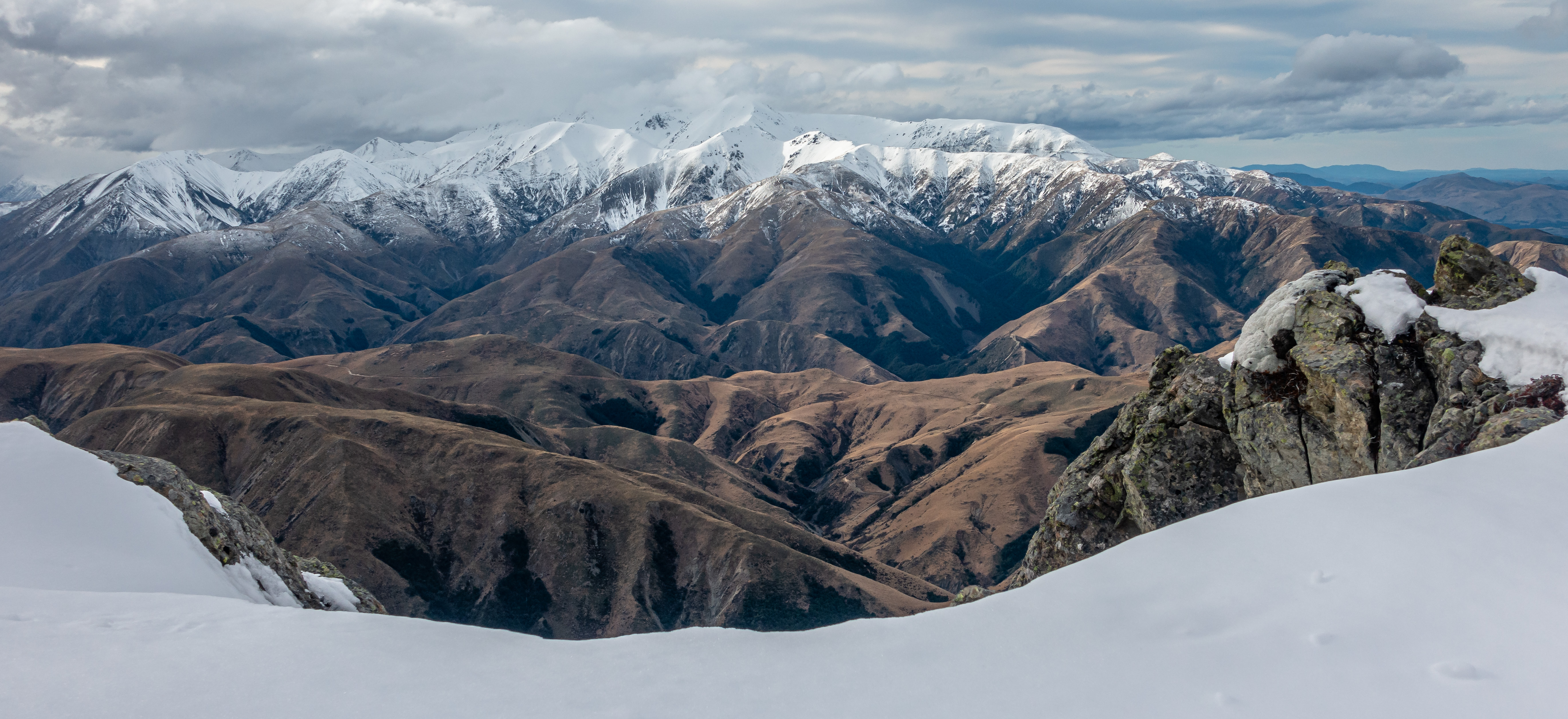
Old Man Range, type locality of A. dionysias.

This species was described by Edward Meyrick in 1907 as Xanthorhoe dionysias using material collected by J.H. Lewis at the Old Man Range / Kopuwai in Central Otago in February. George Hudson discussed and illustrated this species under the name Xanthorhoe dionysias in his 1928 publication The Butterflies and Moths of New Zealand. In 1939 Louis Beethoven Prout placed this species in the genus Larentia. This placement was not accepted by New Zealand taxonomists. In 1971 J. S. Dugdale placed this species in the genus Asaphodes. In 1988 J. S. Dugdale confirmed this placement. The female holotype specimen, collected at Old Man Range, is held at the Natural History Museum, London.

== Description ==
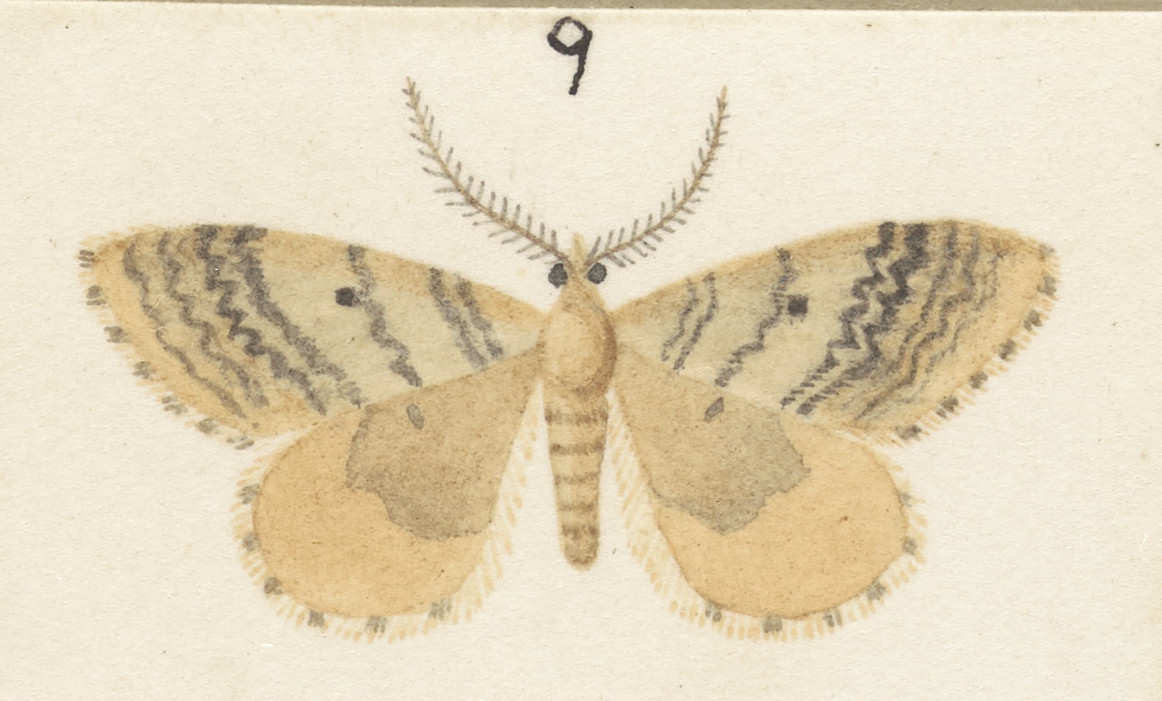
Illustration of male A. ionysias by George Hudson.

Meyrick described the species as follows:

♂︎. 28 mm. Head, palpi, and thorax pale-ochreous tinged with brown-reddish. Forewings somewhat elongate-triangular, costa gently arched, subsinuate in middle, termen rather bowed, oblique, not waved; pale greyish-ochreous, towards costa suffusedly tinged with reddish- ochreous; basal area indistinctly striated with dark fuscous irroration; median band defined anteriorly by two curved similar striae, posteriorly by three curved dark striae enclosing two lines, first pale, second slightly tinged with reddish- ochreous; within median band are two suffused strife connected by a transverse dark-fuscous discal dot, first obsolete in middle; terminal area irrorated with dark-fuscous; an interrupted dark-fuscous terminal line : cilia pale-greyish-ochreous, barred with dark-fuscous irroration. Hindwings elongate, termen rounded, faintly waved; pale greyish-ochreous, thinly irrorated with grey; a blackish discal dot; a cloudy grey postmedian line; cilia pale greyish-ochreous mixed with grey.

The female of the species is brachypterous.

== Distribution ==
This species is endemic to New Zealand. This moth is known only from a limited area which includes The Remarkables, Ben Lomond, Dunstan Mountains, and Old Man Range in Central Otago.

== Biology and life cycle ==
The adults of this species are on the wing in January and February.

== Habitat and host species ==
This moth prefers open grassy mountainous habitat at altitudes of up to 1750m. It is known to frequent wetland habitat. Larvae of this species feed on herbs found in the wet tussock grassland.
