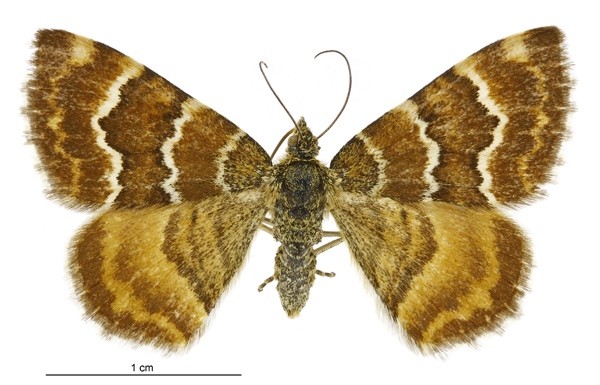
- Female
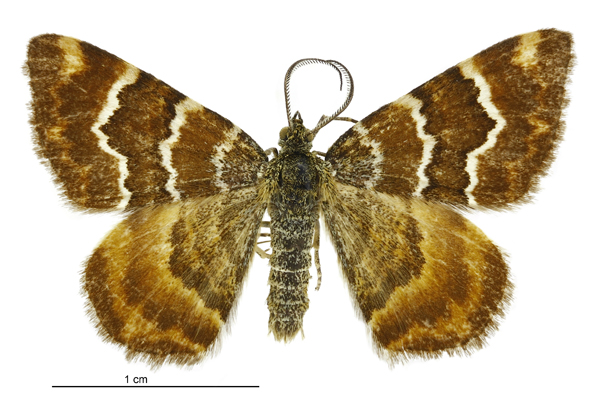
- Male

Scientific classification
- Kingdom: Animalia
- Phylum: Arthropoda
- Clade: Pancrustacea
- Class: Insecta
- Order: Lepidoptera
- Family: Geometridae
- Genus: Notoreas
- Species: N. niphocrena

Binomial name
- Notoreas niphocrena (Meyrick, 1883)

Synonyms
- Pasithea niphocrena Meyrick, 1883

= Notoreas niphocrena =

Species of moth

Notoreas niphocrena is a species of moth in the family Geometridae. It is endemic to New Zealand.

== Taxonomy ==
This species was first described in 1883 by Edward Meyrick using material collected by him above Arthur's Pass at an elevation of approximately 1350 metres. He named the species Pasithea niphocrena. In 1884 Meyrick went on to give a more detailed description of the species. In 1886 Meyrick renamed the genus to which he had previously assigned this species and placed it within the genus Notoreas.

George Hudson discussed this species both in his 1898 book New Zealand Moths and Butterflies (Macro-lepidoptera) and in his 1928 book The Butterflies and Moths of New Zealand and illustrated it in the latter publication. The genus Notoreas was reviewed in 1986 by R. C. Craw and the placement of this species within it was confirmed. However species within the genus Notoreas are currently regarded as being in need of revision. The lectotype specimen is held at the Natural History Museum, London.

== Description ==
Meyrick described the species as follows:

Female. — 24-25 mm. Forewings moderate, hindmargin rounded; rather dark fuscous, mixed and obscurely striated with orange; a curved white suffused with dark fuscous, mixed and obscurely striated with orange; a curved white subdentate line before 1/4 anteriorly blackish-margined; a similar white line beyond 1/4, posteriorly blackish-margined; space between these sometimes suffused with orange; a slender irregularly dentate white fascia beyond middle, rather strongly angulated in middle, anteriorly blackish-margined, posteriorly closely followed by a dentate orange line; a dentate orange line near hindmargin, dilated on costa. Hindwings moderate, hindmargin rounded; orange, lighter anteriorly; basal half dark fuscous mixed with orange, its outer edge irregularly curved; a dentate subterminal fascia and narrow hindmarginal fascia dark fuscous, sometimes obscure.

== Distribution ==
N. niphocrena is endemic to New Zealand. Along with its type locality of Arthur's Pass, N. niphocrena has also been found in the North Island at Mount Hector and Mount Dundas in the Tararua Range, and in the South Island at Mount Arthur Tableland, and Bold Peak in Otago.

== Life cycle and behaviour ==
The female moth lays her eggs within the flower buds of their host plant. When the larvae emerge from their eggs, they eat into the leaves or buds of their host, hiding from predators. Once they are large enough, they emerge to feed from the fresh growth of the plant. N. niphocrena pupate in a loose cocoon on the ground under their host. N. niphocrena are day-flying moths. They are low but fast flyers and constantly vibrate their wings to enable them to take off rapidly. Adults are on the wing in January.

== Habitat and host species ==
This moth species prefers to live in open high alpine habitat. The host plants for the larvae of N. niphocrena are endemic species within the genera Kelleria and Pimelea.
