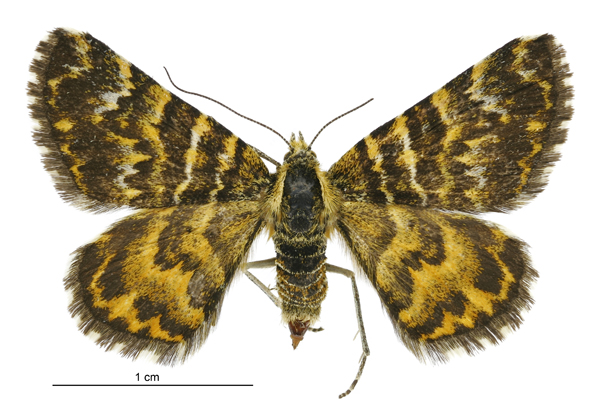
- Female
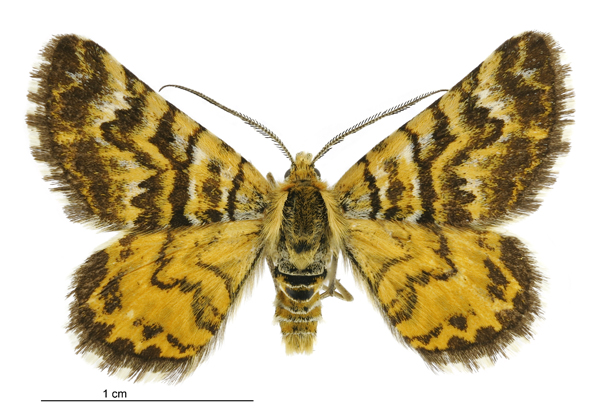
- Male

Scientific classification
- Kingdom: Animalia
- Phylum: Arthropoda
- Class: Insecta
- Order: Lepidoptera
- Family: Geometridae
- Genus: Notoreas
- Species: N. elegans

Binomial name
- Notoreas elegans Patrick & Hoare, 2010

= Notoreas elegans =

Species of moth

Notoreas elegans is a species of moth in the family Geometridae, endemic to New Zealand. This species has a wide distribution in New Zealand and is therefore regarded as not being in need of conservation.

== Taxonomy and etymology ==
This species was first described in 2010 by Brian Patrick and Robert J.B. Hoare. The epithet elegans means elegant and was used to honour the attractive colouration and pattern on the wings of the adult moth.

== Description ==
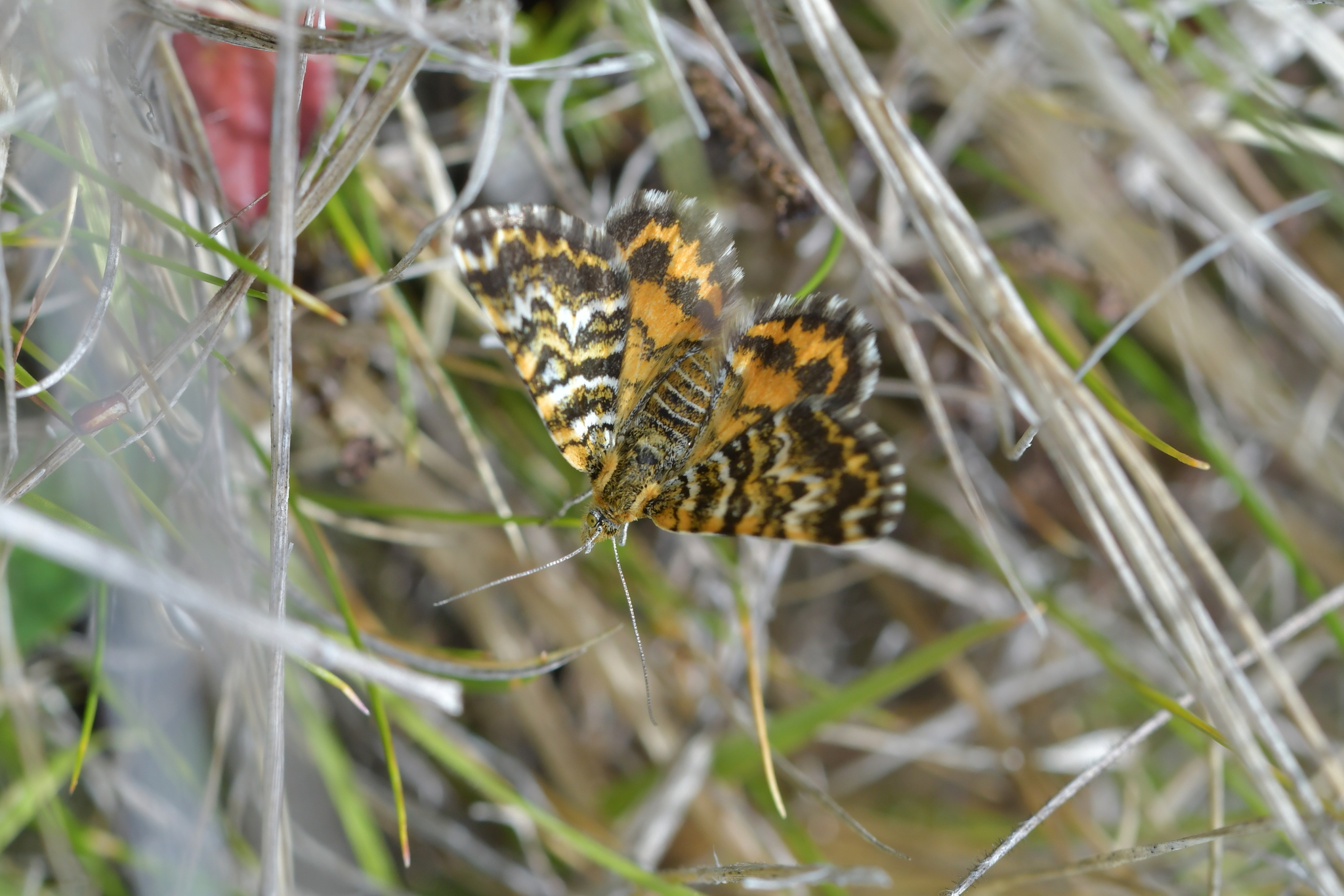

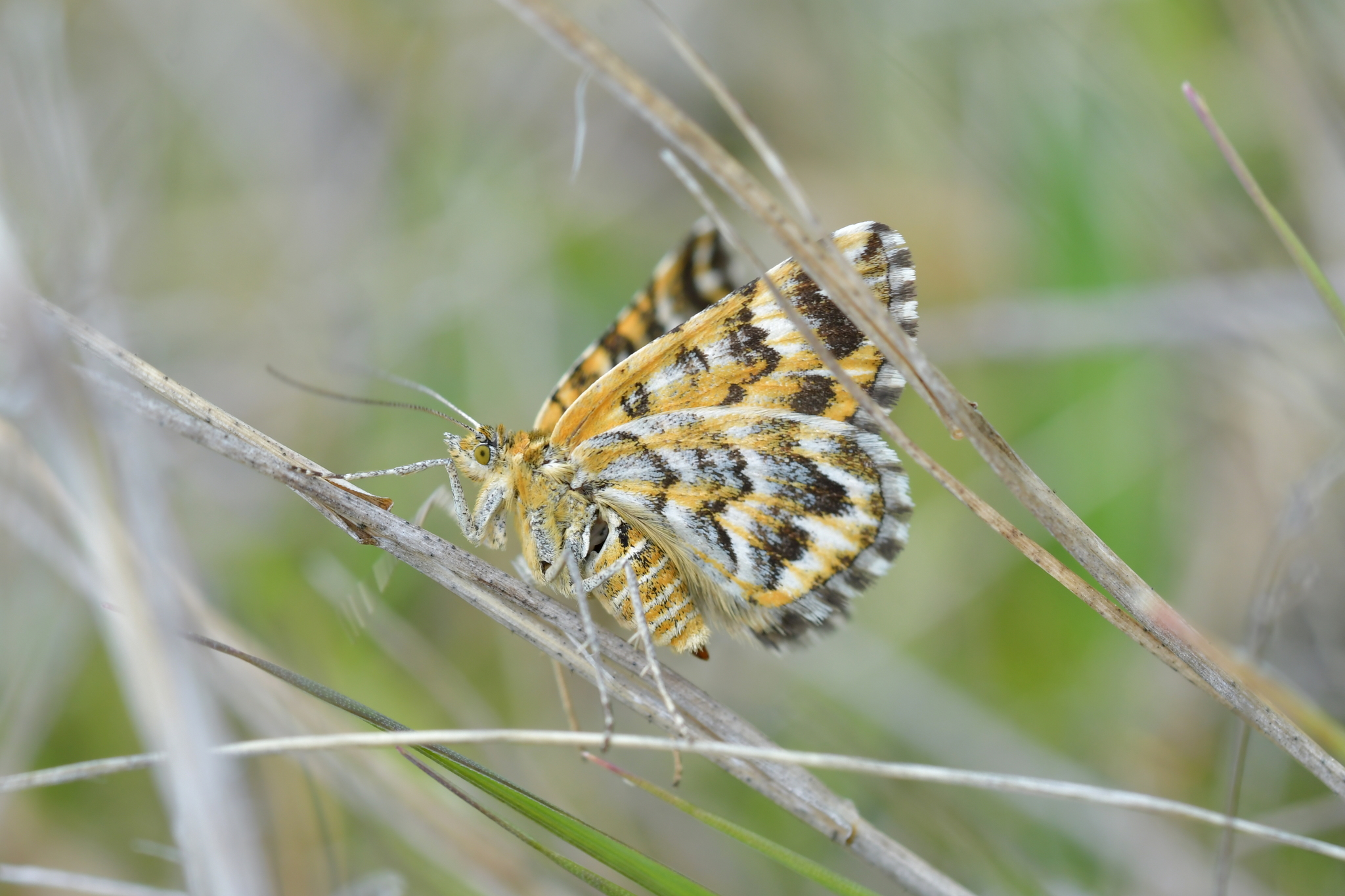

When mature N. elegans larvae have a brown head, a bright green body with a band on its dorsal side coloured white with pink and yellow hints. The subdorsal portion of the larvae has some white shading and there is also a lateral band of pale white pink.

Adult moths of this species have bright orange and white markings on their forewings with orange and black-marked hindwings. N. elegans is similar in appearance to its close relations N. edwardsi and N. casanova.

== Distribution ==
This species is endemic to New Zealand. N. elegans occurs at elevations of between 150 and 1900 metres in the valleys and alpine areas of the Mackenzie Basin, South Canterbury, Otago and Fiordland.

== Life cycle and behaviour ==
This species normally produces two broods per year but it has been hypothesised that at some localities it may produce only once in a season. The female moth lays her eggs within the flower buds of their host plant. When the larvae emerge from their eggs, they eat into the leaves or buds of their host, hiding from predators. Once they are large enough, they emerge to feed from the fresh growth of the plant. N. elegans pupate in a loose cocoon on the ground under their host. The species spends approximately 43 days in their cocoon before emerging as an adult. N. elegans are day flying moths. They are low but fast flyers and constantly vibrate their wings to enable them to take off rapidly.

== Host species ==
The host plants for the larvae of N. elegants are endemic species within the genus Pimelea. These include Pimelea aridula, Pimelea oreophila, Pimelea pseudolyallii, Pimelea sericeovillosa and Pimelea traversii.

== Conservation status ==
This species has a wide distribution in New Zealand and is therefore regarded as not being in need of conservation.
