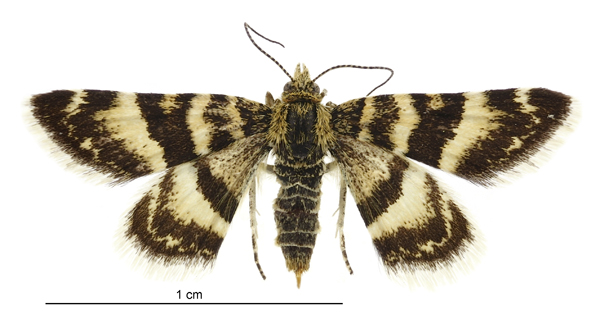
- Female
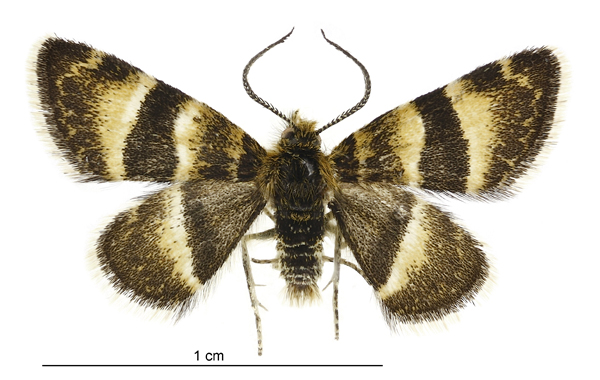
- Male

Scientific classification
- Kingdom: Animalia
- Phylum: Arthropoda
- Clade: Pancrustacea
- Class: Insecta
- Order: Lepidoptera
- Family: Geometridae
- Genus: Notoreas
- Species: N. ortholeuca

Binomial name
- Notoreas ortholeuca Hudson, 1923

= Notoreas ortholeuca =

Species of moth

Notoreas ortholeuca is a species of moth in the family Geometridae. It is endemic to New Zealand.

== Taxonomy ==
This species was first described in 1923 by George Hudson using material collected by F. S. Oliver at Stoney Peak, Glenorchy near Lake Wakatipu. Hudson discussed and illustrated this species in his 1928 book The Butterflies and Moths of New Zealand. The genus Notoreas was reviewed in 1986 by R. C. Craw and the placement of this species within it was confirmed. However species within the genus Notoreas are currently regarded as being in need of revision. The holotype specimen was held in F. S. Oliver's collection and has since been lost.

== Description ==
Hudson described the species as follows:

The expansion of the wings is 1 5/8 inches. The fore-wings are very broad, with the termen slightly waved and hardly oblique, pale brownish-ochreous strongly tinged with grey, with the principal veins strongly marked in ochreous; there is a very short brownish-black basal streak; the first and second lines are much interrupted, strongly dendate, and very indistinct; there is an obscure dentate line between these; the subterminal line is double, strongly waved, brownish-black, with a very pronounced sinuation below apex; the inner subterminal line is the stronger, especially below costa and on veins 5, 2 and 1; there is a series of conspicuous terminal dots. The hind-wings are very broad, with the termen hardly waved, pale greyish-ochreous clouded with grey on the terminal third; there are several indistinct dots on the middle of termen. The cilia of all the wings are grey-ochreous. The head and thorax are greyish-ochreous speckled and dotted with blackish-brown, the latter with a broad brownish-black band and on each side. The abdomen is brownish-ochreous. The antennae of the male are heavily bipectinated, with the apex simple.

== Distribution ==
N. ortholeuca is endemic to New Zealand. Along with its type locality of Stoney Peak, N. ortholeuca has also been found in other mountainous areas in Central Otago including at the Obelisk Station and in the Dansey Ecological District including in the Kakanui Mountains.

== Life cycle and behaviour ==
The female moth lays her eggs within the flower buds of their host plant. When the larvae emerge from their eggs, they eat into the leaves or buds of their host, hiding from predators. Once they are large enough, they emerge to feed from the fresh growth of the plant. N. ortholeuca pupate in a loose cocoon on the ground under their host. N. ortholeuca are day-flying moths. They are low but fast flyers and constantly vibrate their wings to enable them to take off rapidly. Adults are on the wing in January, February and March.

== Habitat and host species ==
This moth species prefers to live in high alpine habitat and have been found in fellfields. The host plants for the larvae of N. ortholeuca are endemic species within the genus Kelleria including Kelleria childii.
