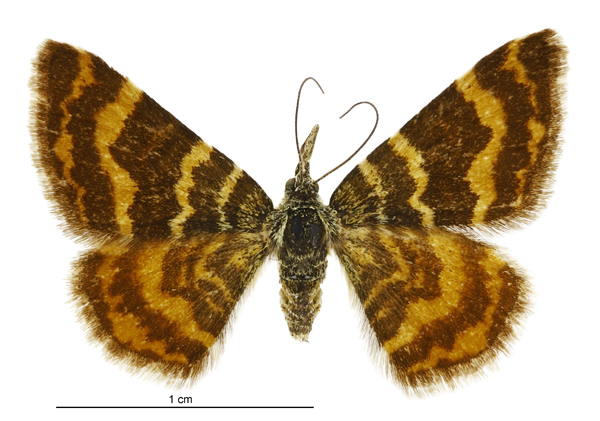
- Female
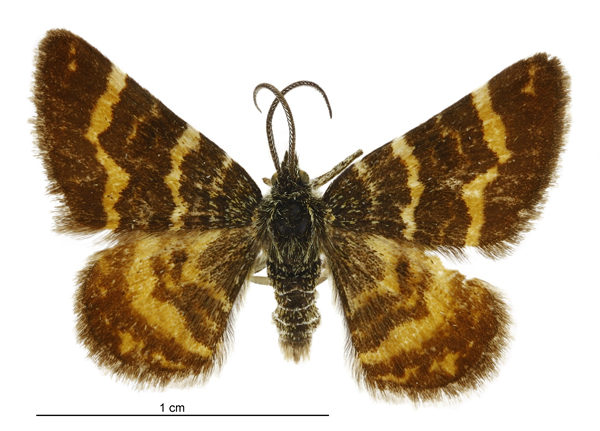
- Male

Scientific classification
- Kingdom: Animalia
- Phylum: Arthropoda
- Clade: Pancrustacea
- Class: Insecta
- Order: Lepidoptera
- Family: Geometridae
- Genus: Notoreas
- Species: N. chrysopeda

Binomial name
- Notoreas chrysopeda (Meyrick, 1888)

Synonyms
- Arctesthes chrysopeda Meyrick, 1888 (As Arcteuthes chrysopeda); Lythria chrysopeda (Meyrick, 1888)

= Notoreas chrysopeda =

Species of moth endemic to New Zealand

Notoreas chrysopeda is a species of moth in the family Geometridae. This species is endemic to New Zealand. It is a colourful day flying moth that lives in mountainous habitat.

== Taxonomy ==
This species was described by Edward Meyrick in 1888 using material collected at Mount Arthur at an altitude of approximately 1200m in January and named Arcteuthes chrysopeda. Meyrick misspelt the genus, the correct spelling of which is Arctesthes. George Hudson discussed and illustrated this species under the name Lythria chrysopeda in both his 1898 book New Zealand moths and butterflies (Macro-lepidoptera) and his 1928 publication The Butterflies and Moths of New Zealand. Robin C. Craw placed this species within the genus Notoreas in 1986. The lectotype specimen is held at the Natural History Museum, London.

== Description ==
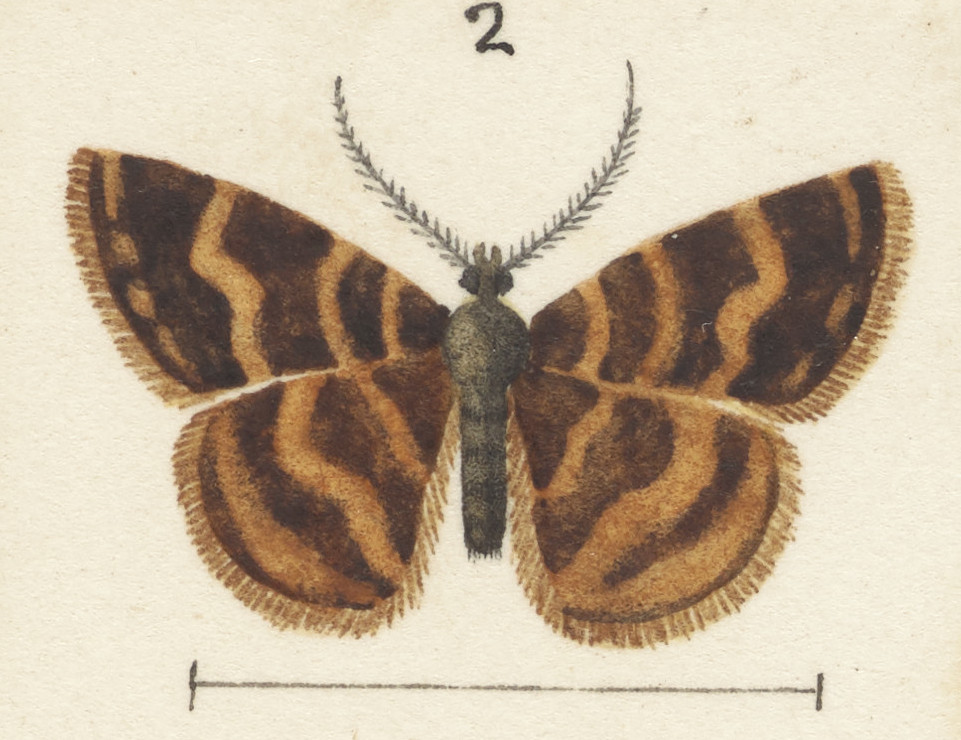
Illustration of N. chrysopeda by George Hudson.

Meyrick described the species as follows:

Male, female.—16–20 mm. Head, palpi, antennae, thorax, abdomen, and legs black, irrorated with ochreous-yellowish or ochreous-whitish. Antennal pectinations of male: a, 2; b, 3. Forewings with hindmargin rather obliquely rounded; 6 out of 9, 7 from above or below angle of areole, 11 from or below angle of areole; dark fuscous, or dark ochreous-brown; base some-what irrorated with orange; four orange fasciae, tolerably equidistant; first linear, slightly curved; second narrow, almost straight; third rather narrow, forming a short obtuse angle inwards below middle; fourth subterminal, linear, sometimes interrupted or nearly obsolete, irregularly subdentate; some-times a discal spot partially indicated by fine orange margins: cilia brown, with obscure darker fuscous quadrate spots on basal half, alternating with obscure whitish spots on terminal half. Hindwings with colour, markings, and cilia as in forewings, but first fascia absent; second unevenly angulated in middle; third broader, sometimes preceded by a fine additional orange line; fourth broader in middle. Under-surface similar to upper, but orange markings broader and lighter; cilia barred throughout with white.

== Distribution ==
This species is endemic to New Zealand. It is found in the Mount Arthur tableland.

== Biology and behaviour ==
This species is on the wing in January and February. It is a day flying moth, most active in bright sunshine.

== Habitat and host species ==
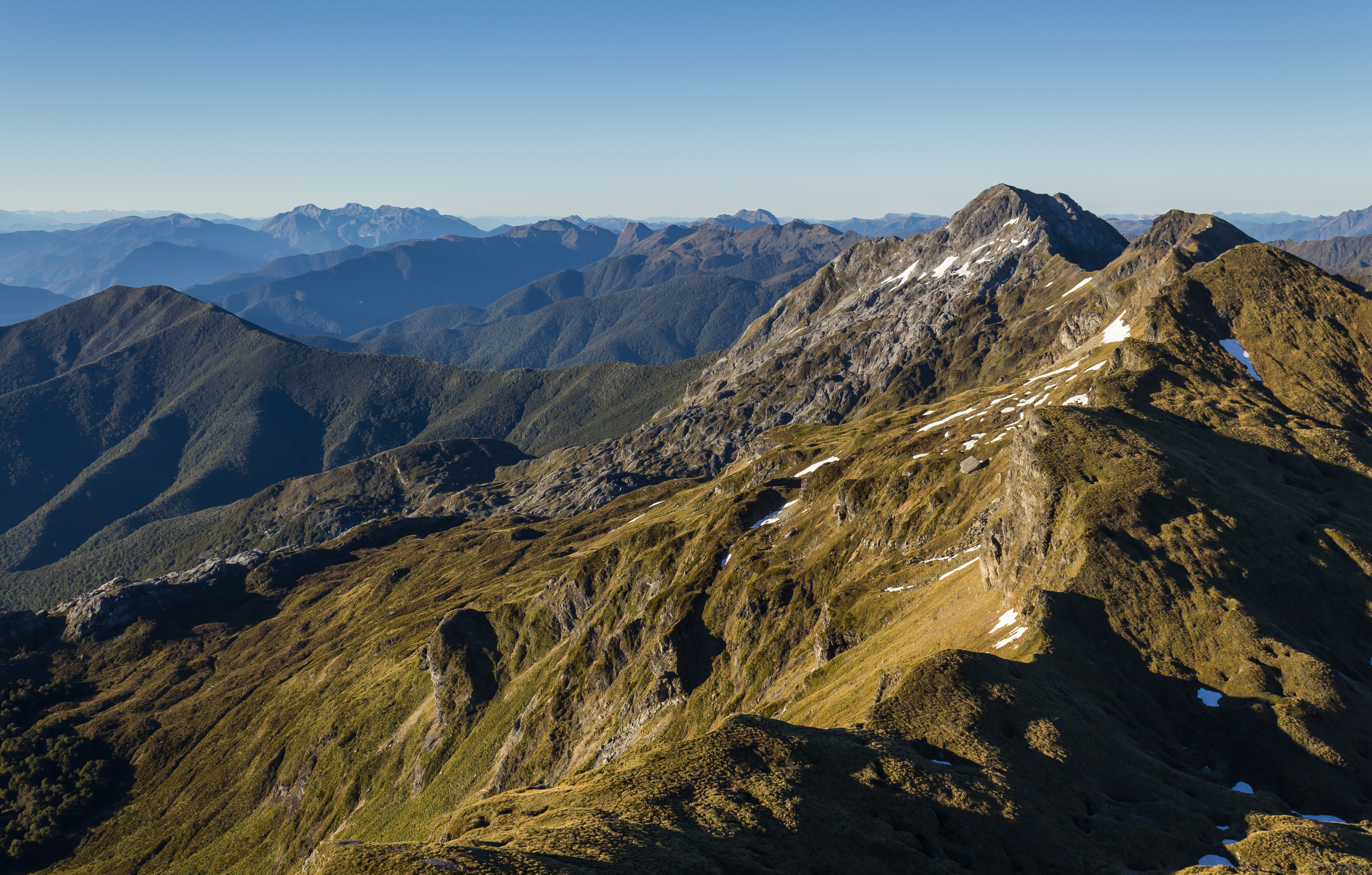
Mount Arthur Range, the type locality of this species.

N. chrysopeda prefers open tussock clearings in mountainous forest habitat. Larvae of New Zealand moths within the genus Notoreas feed exclusively on plants within the genera Pimelea and Kelleria.
