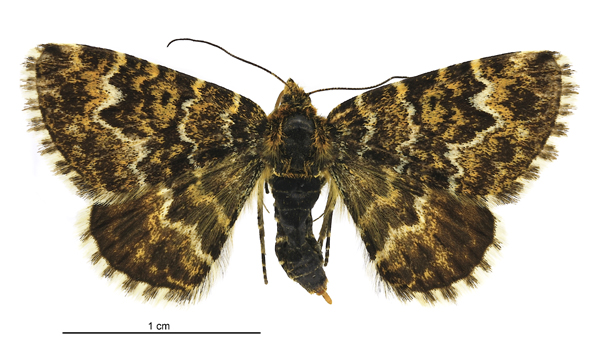
- Female Notoreas arcuata

Scientific classification
- Kingdom: Animalia
- Phylum: Arthropoda
- Clade: Pancrustacea
- Class: Insecta
- Order: Lepidoptera
- Family: Geometridae
- Subfamily: Larentiinae
- Tribe: Hydriomenini
- Genus: Notoreas; Meyrick, 1885

= Notoreas =

Genus of moths

Notoreas is a genus of geometer moths endemic to New Zealand. The genus was described by Edward Meyrick in 1885.

== Species ==
Species include:

- Notoreas arcuata
- Notoreas atmogramma
- Notoreas blax
- Notoreas casanova
- Notoreas chioneres
- Notoreas chrysopeda
- Notoreas edwardsi
- Notoreas elegans
- Notoreas galaxias
- Notoreas hexaleuca
- Notoreas ischnocyma
- Notoreas isoleuca
- Notoreas isomoera
- Notoreas mechanitis
- Notoreas niphocrena
- Notoreas ortholeuca
- Notoreas paradelpha
- Notoreas perornata
- Notoreas simplex
