= Kelleria bogongensis =

Scientific classification
- Kingdom: Plantae
- Clade: Tracheophytes
- Clade: Angiosperms
- Clade: Eudicots
- Clade: Rosids
- Order: Malvales
- Family: Thymelaeaceae
- Genus: Kelleria
- Species: K. bogongensis

Binomial name
- Kelleria bogongensis Marks

Species of shrub

Kelleria bogongensis is a Victorian endemic species in the family Thymelaeaceae.

== Range ==
The species is known only from the Bogong High Plains where it grows in alpine tussock grasslands. It is listed as Vulnerable in Australia and Critically Endangered in Victoria.

== Taxonomy ==
The species was formally included in Kelleria laxa, which is now a New Zealand endemic.
