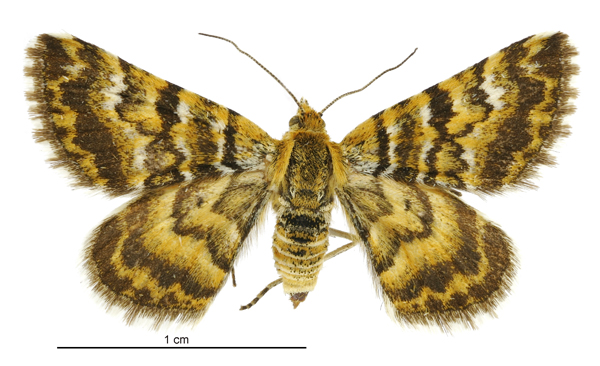
- Female
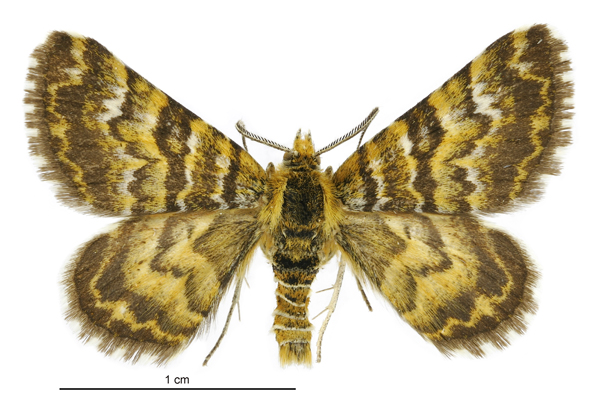
- Male

Conservation status
- Nationally Vulnerable (NZ TCS)

Scientific classification
- Kingdom: Animalia
- Phylum: Arthropoda
- Clade: Pancrustacea
- Class: Insecta
- Order: Lepidoptera
- Family: Geometridae
- Genus: Notoreas
- Species: N. casanova

Binomial name
- Notoreas casanova Patrick & Hoare, 2010

= Notoreas casanova =

Species of moth

Notoreas casanova is a species of moth in the family Geometridae. It is endemic to New Zealand. This species has been classified as Nationally Vulnerable by the Department of Conservation.

== Taxonomy ==
This species was first described in 2010 by Brian Patrick and Robert J.B. Hoare. The type specimen was collected by Patrick at Fortrose Spit in Southland on 24 January 1990. The type specimen is held at the New Zealand Arthropod Collection. The species is named after Giacomo Casanova.

== Description ==
N. casanova larvae start off life yellow-green in colour. As they mature they have an orange head and turn a pinkish colour.

Adult moths of N. casanova are very similar in appearance to its close relation N. elegans. However N. casanova can be distinguished as it is normally smaller, has complete subterminal black band on the underside of its forewing, as well as a complete black line on its hindwing.

== Distribution ==
This species is endemic to New Zealand. Populations of N. casanova have been found at Fortrose Spit, Tiwai Peninsula and Three Sisters Sand Dune, all in Southland. A likely site also exists at Sandhill Point in Fiordland.

== Life cycle and behaviour ==
The female lays her yellow eggs in groups on the flowers of the host plants or alternatively singly on leaves. Eggs hatch after 14 days and the larvae originally appear green-yellow. They spend approximately 87 days as larvae and then 12 days preparing to pupate. They pupate in a loose cocoon on the ground under their host. The species spends approximately 151 days in their cocoon before emerging as an adult. N. casanova are day flying moths. They are low but fast flyers and constantly vibrate their wings to enable them to take off rapidly.

== Habitat ==
This species prefers either areas of coastal sand and pebbles or sand dunes.

== Host species ==
The host plants for the larvae of N. casanova are the endemic plants Pimelea lyallii and Pimelea prostrata.

== Conservation status ==
This moth is classified under the New Zealand Threat Classification system as being Nationally Vulnerable.
