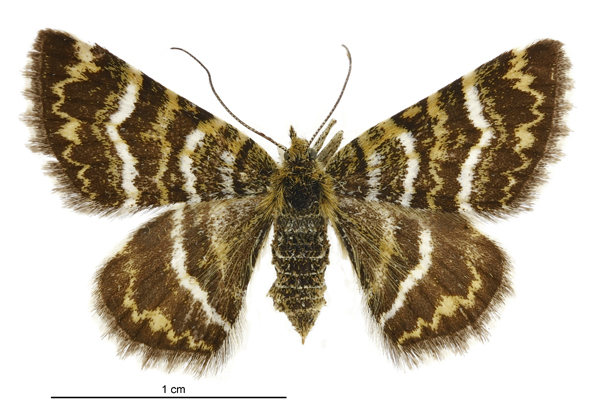
- Female
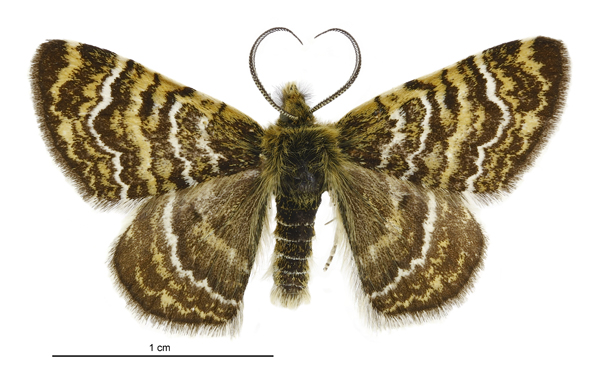
- Male

Scientific classification
- Kingdom: Animalia
- Phylum: Arthropoda
- Clade: Pancrustacea
- Class: Insecta
- Order: Lepidoptera
- Family: Geometridae
- Genus: Notoreas
- Species: N. mechanitis

Binomial name
- Notoreas mechanitis (Meyrick, 1883)

Synonyms
- Pasithea mechanitis Meyrick, 1883

= Notoreas mechanitis =

Species of moth

Notoreas mechanitis is a species of moth in the family Geometridae. It is endemic to New Zealand.

== Taxonomy ==
This species was first described in 1883 by Edward Meyrick using material collected by him at Arthur's Pass and Mount Hutt and named Pasithea mechanitis. In 1884 Meyrick went on to give a more detailed description of the species. In 1886 Meyrick renamed the genus to which he had previously assigned this species and placed it within the genus Notoreas.

George Hudson discussed and illustrated this species both in his 1898 book New Zealand Moths and Butterflies (Macro-lepidoptera) and in his 1928 book The Butterflies and Moths of New Zealand. The genus Notoreas was reviewed in 1986 by R. C. Craw and the placement of this species within it was confirmed. However species within the genus Notoreas are currently regarded as being in need of revision. The lectotype specimen is held at the Natural History Museum, London.

== Description ==
Meyrick described the species as follows:

Male, female. — 19-23 mm. Forewings moderate, hind margin rounded; dark fuscous, densely irrorated and median band almost wholly suffused with yellow; a nearly straight yellow or whitish line towards base, anteriorly strongly blackish-margined; an irregularly curved white line at 1/3, posteriorly strongly blackish-margined; a small blackish discal dot; an irregularly angulated slender dark fuscous median line, beyond which is another almost confluent with next line; a white line beyond middle, anteriorly strongly blackish-margined, strongly angulated in middle, subdentate beneath; a slender very sharply dentate irregular yellow subterminal line; cilia with basal half dark grey, apical half wholly white. Hindwings dark fuscous, base irrorated with yellow; an irregular obscure yellow fascia before middle; a white sinuate median line, sometimes yellow above; subterminal line and cilia as in forewings. Constant, except that the white markings tend to be suffused with yellow.

== Distribution ==
N. mechanitis is endemic to New Zealand. Along with its type locality of Arthur's Pass, N. mechanitis has been found at Mount Arthur, Mount Hutt, Ben Lomond, the Hunter Mountains, at Shotover Saddle and Mount Eostre in Otago.

== Life cycle and behaviour ==
The female moth lays her eggs within the flower buds of their host plant. When the larvae emerge from their eggs, they eat into the leaves or buds of their host, hiding from predators. Once they are large enough, they emerge to feed from the fresh growth of the plant. N. mechanitis pupate in a loose cocoon on the ground under their host. N. mechanitis are day-flying moths. They are low but fast flyers and constantly vibrate their wings to enable them to take off rapidly. Adults are on the wing between January and March.

== Habitat and host species ==
This moth species prefers to live in grassy high alpine habitat. The host plants for the larvae of N. mechanitis are endemic species within the genus Kelleria and include Kelleria dieffenbachii. The adults of this moth are also known to pollinate Kelleria dieffenbachii.
