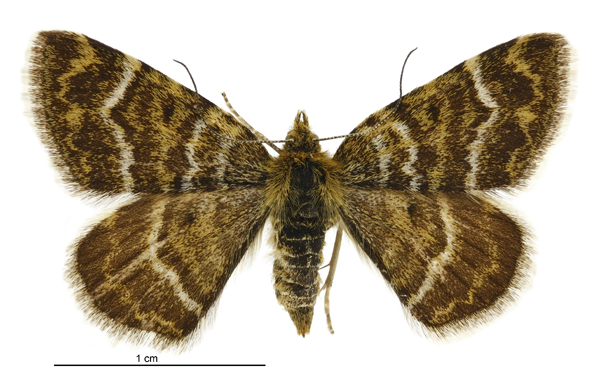
- Female
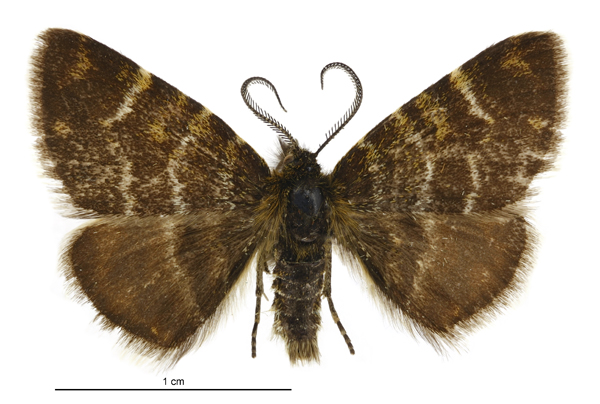
- Male

Scientific classification
- Kingdom: Animalia
- Phylum: Arthropoda
- Clade: Pancrustacea
- Class: Insecta
- Order: Lepidoptera
- Family: Geometridae
- Genus: Notoreas
- Species: N. atmogramma

Binomial name
- Notoreas atmogramma Meyrick, 1911

= Notoreas atmogramma =

Species of moth endemic to New Zealand

Notoreas atmogramma is a species of moth in the family Geometridae. This species is endemic to New Zealand. It is a day flying moth that frequents alpine habitat.

== Taxonomy ==
This species was described by Edward Meyrick in 1911 using material collected by George Hudson at Mount Holdsworth in the Tararua Range at an altitude of approximately 1200m. Hudson discussed and illustrated this species in his 1928 publication The Butterflies and Moths of New Zealand. The lectotype specimen is held at the Natural History Museum, London.

== Description ==
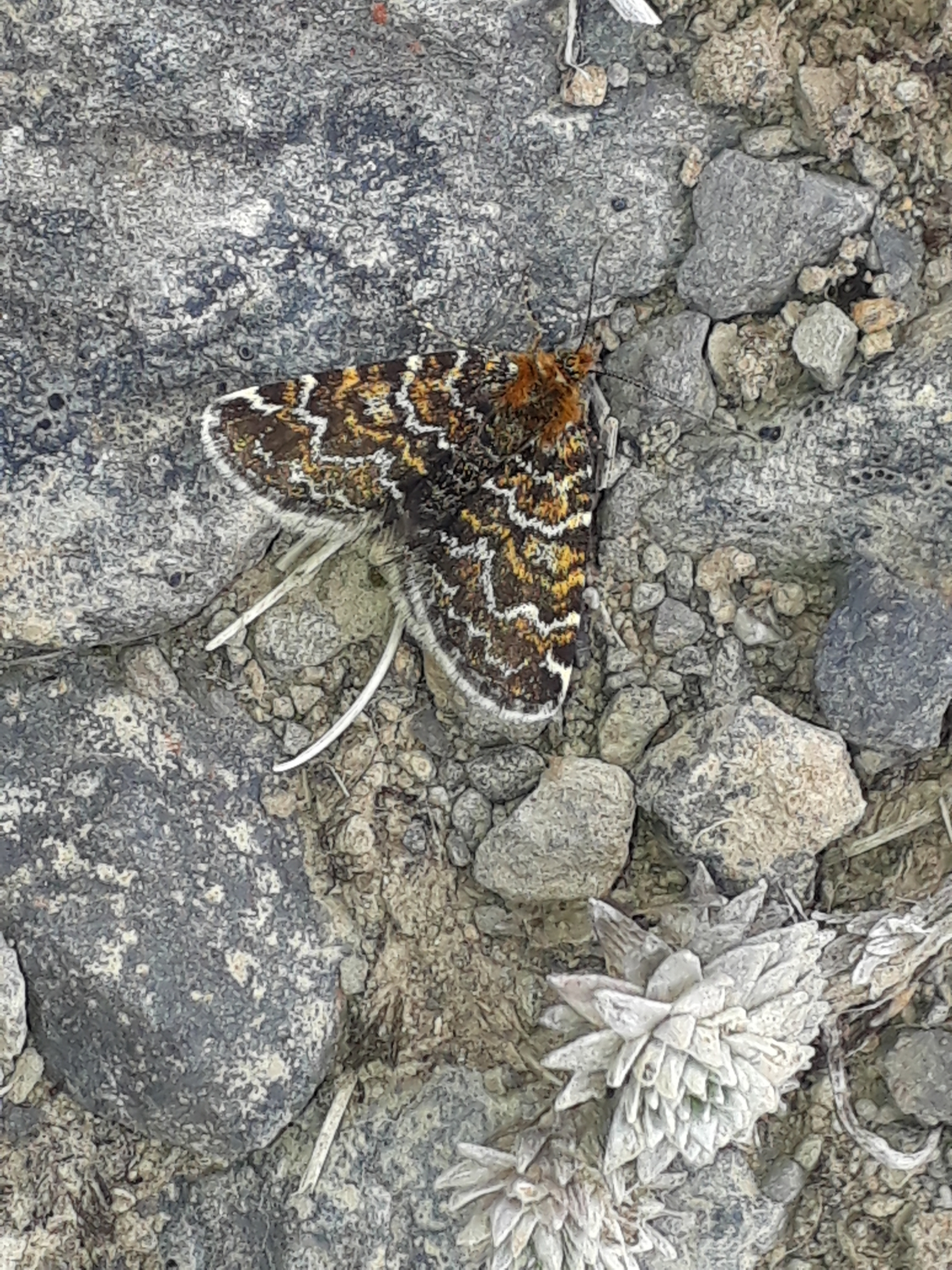
Notoreas atmogramma observed on Mount Holdsworth

Meyrick described the species as follows:

♀︎. 25-27 mm. Head, palpi, and thorax black, mixed with whitish-ochreous-yellowish hairs and scales. Abdomen black, mixed on sides with whitish-yellow, segmental margins slenderly whitish. Forewings triangular, costa straight, apex obtuse, termen rounded, rather oblique; dark fuscous, with a few scattered pale - yellowish scales; lines cloudy, light - yellowish, subbasal, first (and second partially) whitish, first curved, median very indefinite, second angulated in middle, subterminal irregular : cilia white, basal half fuscous. Hindwings with termen rounded; colour and markings as in forewings, but basal area irrorated with pale yellowish, subbasal and first lines obsolete, second somewhat bent in middle : cilia as in forewings. Under-surface of all wings light ochreous-yellow; first and second lines indistinctly indicated by whitish suffusion; forewings with some incomplete cloudy blackish lines; hindwings with a blackish discal mark.

== Distribution ==
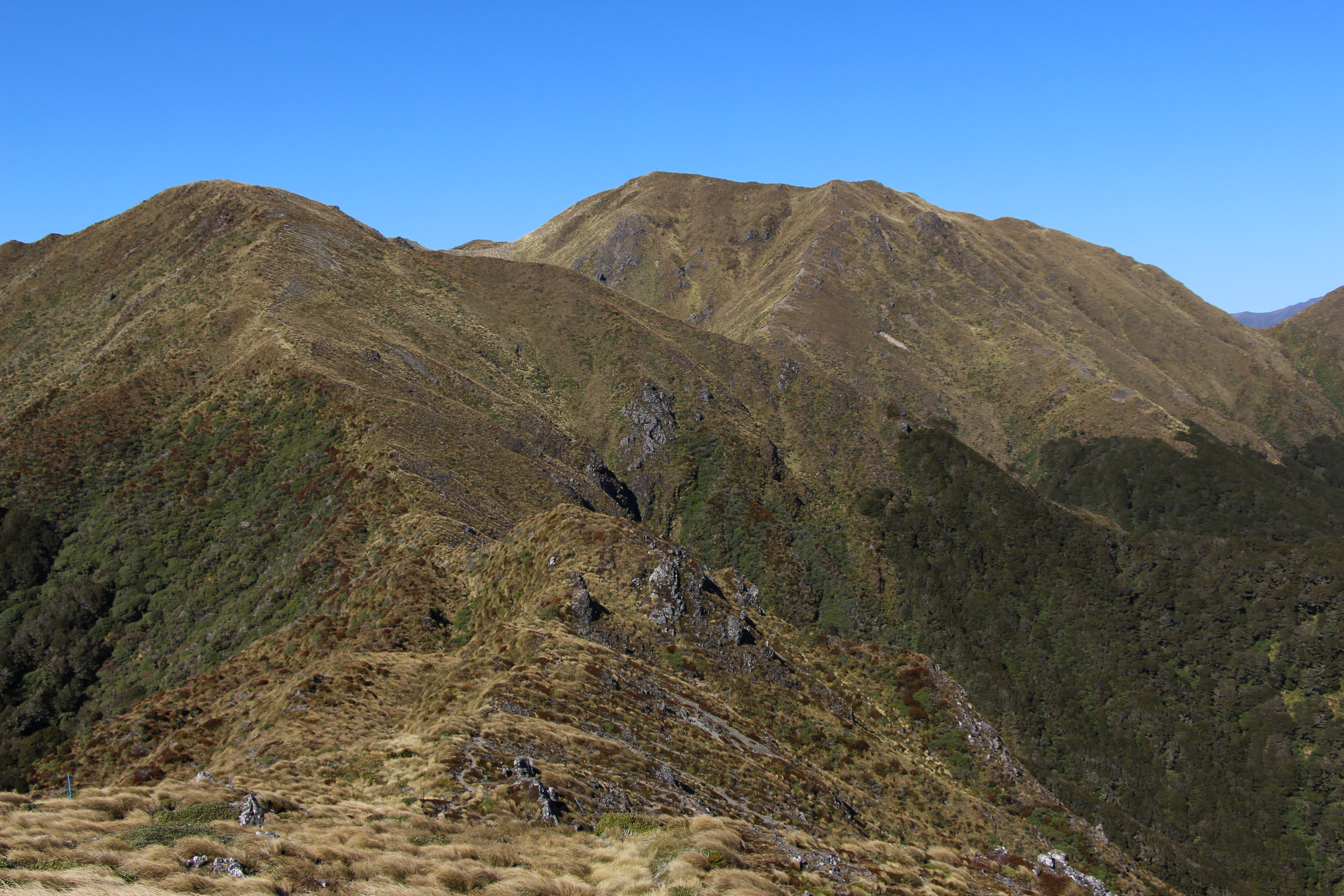
Mount Holdsworth, Tararua Range

This species is endemic to New Zealand. Along with Mount Holdsworth, this species has been found at Mount Taranaki, the Pouakai Range in Taranaki, and Lewis Pass.

== Biology and behaviour ==
This species is on the wing in January and February. It is an alpine moth that is active during the day.

== Habitat and host species ==
The species frequents open grass alpine habitat. Larvae of species within the genus Notoreas feed exclusively on plants within the genera Pimelea and Kelleria.
