= Earnscleugh River =

Coordinates: 45°14′27″S 169°12′01″E

Earnscleugh or Fraser River

Location
- Country: New Zealand

Physical characteristics
- Source
  - location: Old Man Range
  - elevation: 1,625 m (5,331 ft)
- Mouth
  - location: Clutha River
  - elevation: 130 m (427 ft)

The Earnscleugh or Fraser River is a river of the Otago Region of New Zealand. It arises in the Old Man Range and flows north-east to the Fraser Dam, then south-east to the Clutha River about 4 km (2.5 miles) west of Alexandra. The name Earnscleugh is given to the upper reaches of the river. The lower reaches are called the Fraser River, after one of the owners of Earnscleugh Station, William Fraser, who introduced rabbits to the area.

== See also ==
- List of rivers of New Zealand
