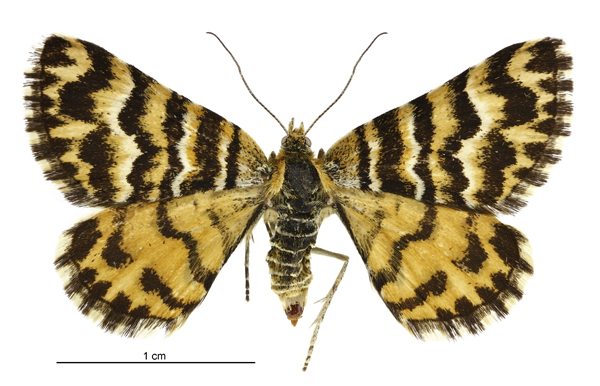
- Female
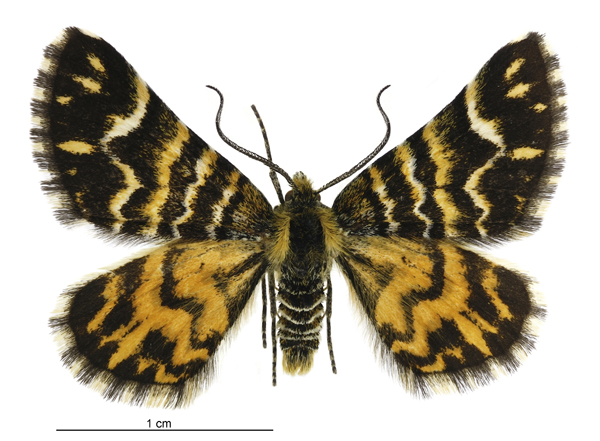
- Male

Scientific classification
- Kingdom: Animalia
- Phylum: Arthropoda
- Clade: Pancrustacea
- Class: Insecta
- Order: Lepidoptera
- Family: Geometridae
- Genus: Notoreas
- Species: N. simplex

Binomial name
- Notoreas simplex Hudson, 1898

Synonyms
- Notoreas regilla (Philpott, 1928); Lythria regilla Philpott, 1928

= Notoreas simplex =

Species of moth

Notoreas simplex is a species of moth in the family Geometridae. It is endemic to New Zealand.

== Taxonomy ==
This species was first described in 1898 by George Hudson using material he collected on Mount Arthur in January. Hudson also discussed and illustrated this species in his 1928 book The Butterflies and Moths of New Zealand. The genus Notoreas was reviewed in 1986 by R. C. Craw and the placement of this species within it was confirmed. In 2010 Brian Patrick, Robert Hoare and Birgit Rhode synonymised Notoreas regilla with N. simplex. Although they retained the species N. simplex this status was regarded by them as tentative. Species within the genus Notoreas are currently regarded as in need of revision and in particular this species is regarded as needing more taxonomic work. The holotype specimen is held at the Museum of New Zealand Te Papa Tongarewa.

== Description ==
Hudson originally described the species as follows:

The expansion of the wings of the female is from 24 to 25 mm. (1 inch). Fore-wings moderate, termen rounded; rather dark fuscous, mixed and obscurely striated with orange; a curved white sub-dentate line before one-fourth, anteriorly blackish margined; a similar white line beyond one-fourth, posteriorly blackish-margined; space between these sometimes suffused with orange; a slender irregularly dentate white fascia beyond middle, rather strongly angulated in middle, anteriorly blackish-margined, posteriorly closely followed by a dentate orange line; a dentate orange line near termen, dilated on costa. Hind-wings moderate, termen rounded; orange, lighter anteriorly; basal half dark fuscous mixed with orange, its outer edge irregularly curved; a dentate subterminal fascia and narrow terminal fascia dark fuscous, sometimes obscure.

However the holotype specimen Hudson used for this description is regarded as diverging from the normal appearance of this species. Also Philpott's specimen used for the first description of Lythria regilla is a distinctive form of N. simplex.

== Distribution ==
N. simplex is endemic to New Zealand. This species is found in the mountains of Nelson, Marlborough and Canterbury and also on the Kaikōura and Canterbury coast as far south as Kaitorete Spit.

== Life cycle and behaviour ==
The female moth lays her eggs within the flower buds of their host plant. When the larvae emerge from their eggs, they eat into the leaves or buds of their host, hiding from predators. Once they are large enough, they emerge to feed from the fresh growth of the plant. N. simplex pupate in a loose cocoon on the ground under their host. N. simplex likely has two generations each year with adults on the wing in the months of late September until April. N. simplex are day-flying moths. They are low but fast flyers and constantly vibrate their wings to enable them to take off rapidly.

== Host species ==
The host plants for the larvae of N. simplex are endemic species of Pimelea including Pimelea prostrata at Kaitorete Spit.
