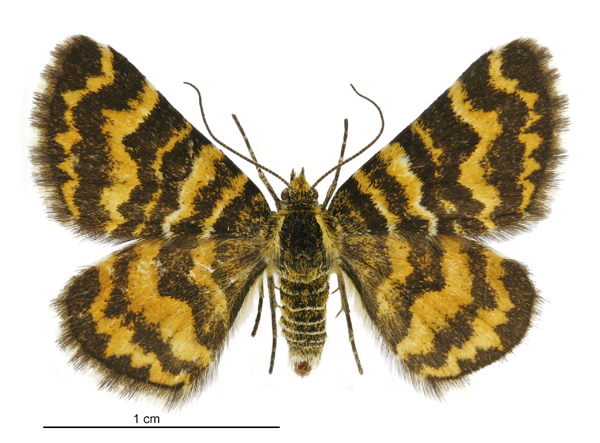
- Female
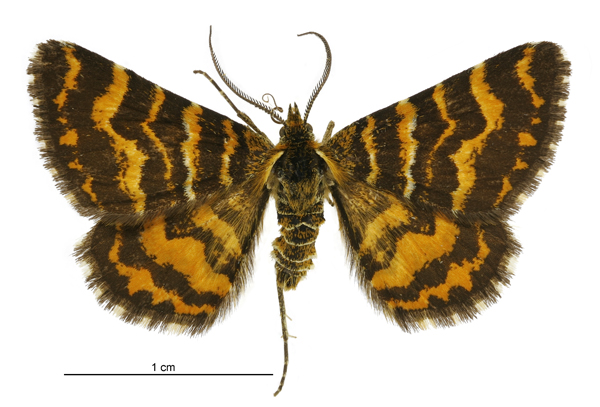
- Male

Scientific classification
- Kingdom: Animalia
- Phylum: Arthropoda
- Clade: Pancrustacea
- Class: Insecta
- Order: Lepidoptera
- Family: Geometridae
- Genus: Notoreas
- Species: N. perornata

Binomial name
- Notoreas perornata (Walker, 1863)

Synonyms
- Fidonia perornata Walker, 1863; Pasithea perornata (Walker, 1863); Lythria perornata (Walker, 1863); Arctesthes perornata (Walker, 1863)

= Notoreas perornata =

Species of moth

Notoreas perornata is a species of moth in the family Geometridae. It is endemic to New Zealand and is found in the North Island from Northland to Westland as well as in the South Island on the coast of Marlborough. This species has two generations per year. Larval host plants are endemic species of Pimelea. The adult moths are day flying and are on the wing from October to November and March to April.

== Taxonomy ==
This species was first described in 1863 by Francis Walker using material collected in either Hawkes Bay or Taupo by William Colenso and named Fidonia perornata. In 1884 Meyrick placed this species within the genus Pasithea. In 1886 Meyrick renamed the genus to which he had previously assigned this species and placed it within the genus Notoreas. George Hudson discussed and illustrated this species both in his 1898 book New Zealand Moths and Butterflies (Macro-lepidoptera) using the name Notoreas perornata and again in his 1928 book The Butterflies and Moths of New Zealand. In the later case Hudson followed Louis Beethoven Prout and used the name Lythria perornata. John S. Dugdale regarded the 1898 illustrations as not a good match but approved of the illustration done by Hudson in 1928. The genus Notoreas was reviewed in 1986 by R. C. Craw and the placement of this species within it was confirmed.

In 2010 Brian Patrick, Robert Hoare and Birgit Rhode studied this species and others in its complex and discussed the taxonomy of the species. However species within the genus Notoreas are currently regarded as being in need of revision and in particular this species is regarded as needing more taxonomic work. The holotype specimen is held at the Natural History Museum, London.

== Description ==
Walker originally described the species as follows:

Male. Black, pilose, whitish cinereous beneath. Frontal tuft prominent. Palpi lanceolate, very pilose, as long as the breadth of the head; third joint conical, minute. Antennae moderately pectinated. Thorax with a white streak on each of the tegulae. Abdomen with luteous speckles; hind borders of the segments white. Fore wings hardly acute, with a slight cupreous tinge and with five luteous partly whitish bands; firsthand straight; second, third and fourth undulating; fifth macular; under side luteous, with five cupreous-black bands. Hind wings luteous, with three undulating cupreous-black bands; exterior border cupreous-black; under side partly white, with the lines accompanied by cupreous-black speckles. Length of the body 1 1/3 lines; of the wings 10 lines.

== Distribution ==
N. perornata is endemic to New Zealand. This species is found in the North Island from Northland to Westland and in the South Island on the coast in Marlborough.

== Life cycle and behaviour ==
The female moth lays her eggs within the flower buds of their host plant. When the larvae emerge from their eggs, they eat into the leaves or buds of their host, hiding from predators. Once they are large enough, they emerge to feed from the fresh growth of the plant. N. perornata pupate in a loose cocoon on the ground under their host. N. perornata has two generations each year with adults on the wing in the months of October to November and March to April. However, in the northern parts of New Zealand this species may be multivoltine. N. perornata are day-flying moths. They are low but fast flyers and constantly vibrate their wings to enable them to take off rapidly.

== Host species ==
The host plants for the larvae of N. perornata are endemic species of Pimelea.
