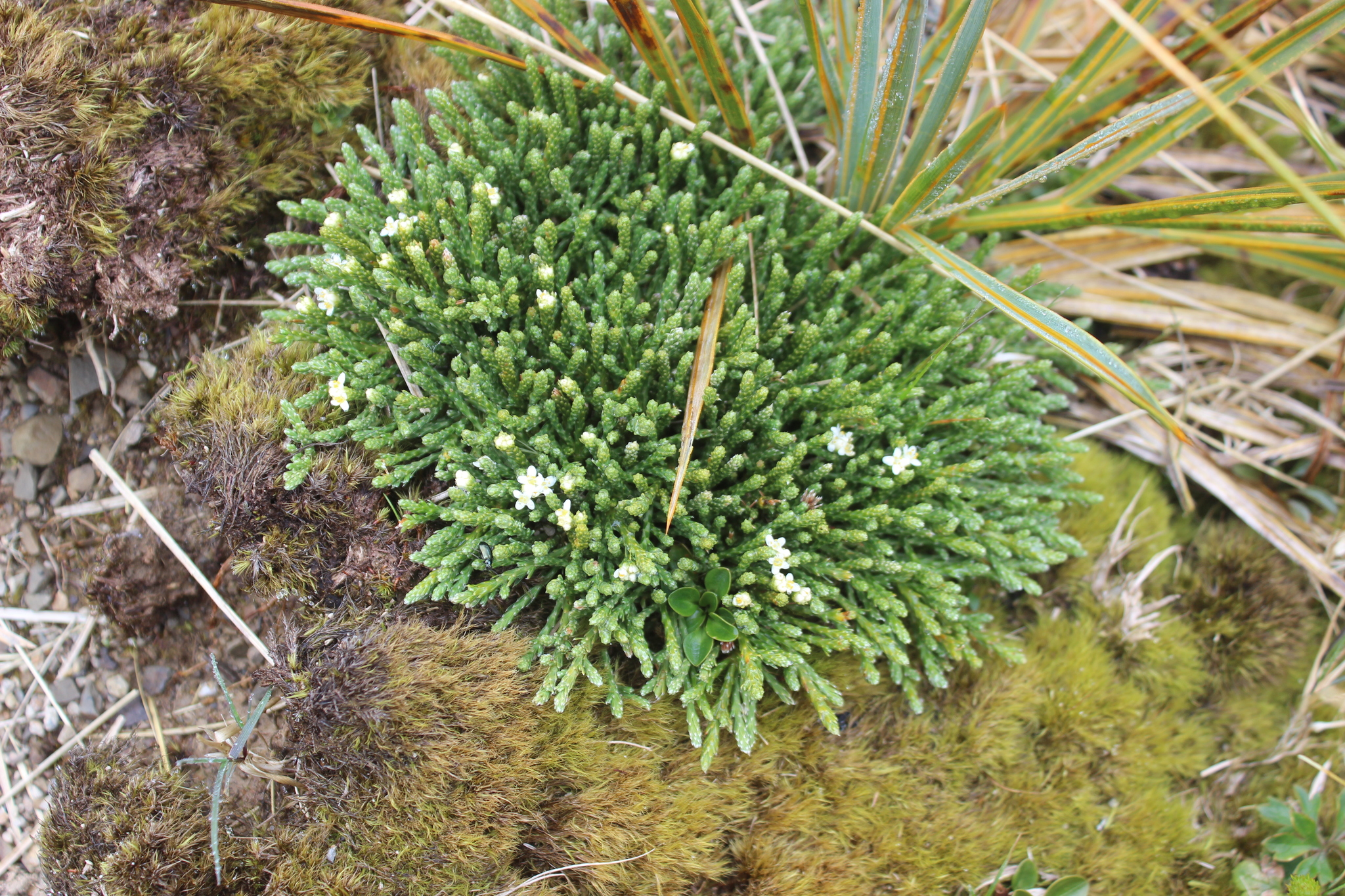
- Kelleria dieffenbachii in Tararua Forest Park near Mt. Hector Pukemoumou

Conservation status
- Not Threatened (NZ TCS)

Scientific classification
- Kingdom: Plantae
- Clade: Tracheophytes
- Clade: Angiosperms
- Clade: Eudicots
- Clade: Rosids
- Order: Malvales
- Family: Thymelaeaceae
- Genus: Kelleria
- Species: K. dieffenbachii

Binomial name
- Kelleria dieffenbachii (Hook.) Endl.

= Kelleria dieffenbachii =

Species of flowering plant

Kelleria dieffenbachii, or alpine Kelleria, is a species of small, spreading, alpine subshrub with tiny, white flowers. It is known from New Zealand, southwest Australia including Tasmania, and the highlands of New Guinea. Described in 1839 by William Jackson Hooker, it is the type species for Kelleria.

== Description ==
Kelleria dieffenbachii is a low-lying perennial shrub that forms large patches of around woody tufts, in groups as wide as 25cm. in diameter. The stems and branches are prostrate, and grow new roots down as they spread. Branchlets are glabrous and up to 5cm. long. The leaves taper. There are 3–8 white florets per head, each 1.5–2mm long.

The flowers are either unisexual or bisexual, with different flowers found on the same plant. The plant flowers from December through February in the austral summer; in New Zealand, flowering may occur from October through May, where flowers have only been seen in September and December in New Guinea.

This species can often be found next to Kelleria villosa; to separate them, observe that "the stem is typically glabrous or clad in only very few scattered hairs, these often congregating on the leafbase" in K. dieffenbachii.

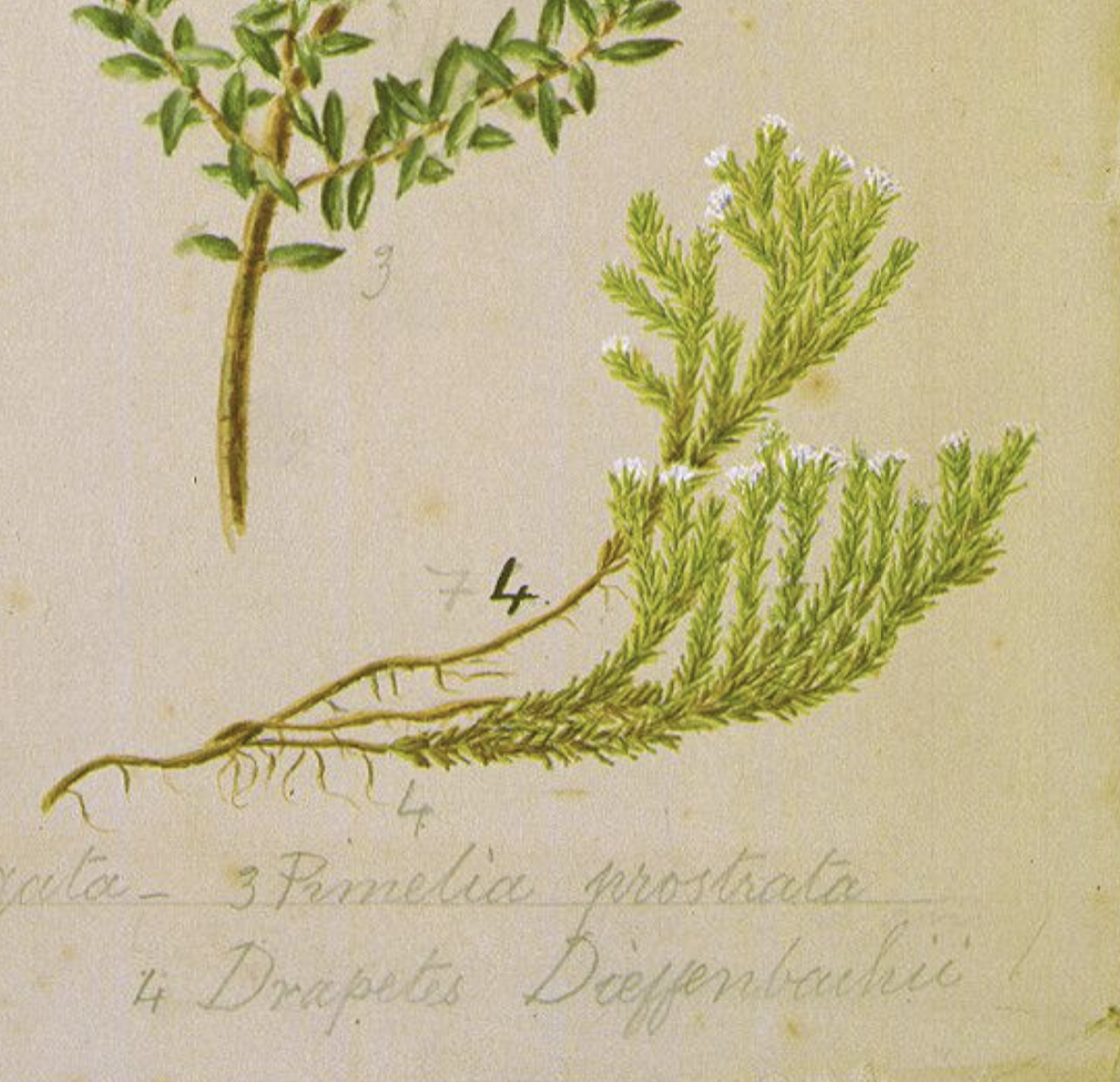
A drawing of Kelleria Dieffenbachii

== Range and Habitat ==
This species is native to the southern hemisphere. It is indigenous to New Zealand, where it can be found on both major islands as well as on Stewart Island / Rakiura, and possibly also on the Chathams and the Auckland Islands. on It is also found in Australia, as in Kosciuszko National Park, as well as in Tasmania. It is also found at elevation, above 3000m., in New Guinea. It may grow on Puncak Trikora, among others in the Sudirman Range.

Kelleria dieffenbachii is found in alpine feldmark, as well as subalpine and subarctic areas. It seems to prefer drier areas than other Kelleria species in the South Island of New Zealand. It can be found in well-drained gravel areas, as well as occasionally in Sphagnum peat bogs.

There is regional variation. Plants from near Taranaki Maunga are glabrous; plants from Mt. Hikurangi are more erect and bright green. In Marlborough, stem hairs are longer than elsewhere. Plants from lower altitudes have hairs at the tip of the leaves.

Kelleria laxa is sometimes considered a variant of this plant, and sometimes not.

== Ecology ==
It is possible that the achenes are disperse by the wind. However, zoochory through invertebrates may also be the main dispersal method of the indeciscent drupe. Anagotus weevils, among other insects, are known to graze on K. dieffenbachii in the Tararuas at night.

The species can be found in Chionachloa grassland, as well as on forest edges, where it associates with Dracophyllum, Olearia, Cassinia and Dacrydium. It also associates with Kelleria villosa.

== Etymology ==
Dieffenbachii is named for Ernst Dieffenbach, who collected some of this plant during his 1839 ascent of Taranaki Maunga. He sent his specimens to William Jackson Hooker at Kew Gardens, who used these specimens with others from John Carne Bidwill to describe the species as Drapetes dieffenbachii. The species was also described by William Colenso, as Drapetes macrantha, which is now a synonym. This name refers to the large anthers. In 1848, Stephan Endlicher moved the species to its own genus, with K. dieffenbachii as the type specimen.

== Cultivation ==
This species can be cultivated, particularly in rock gardens that imitate its alpine and subalpine habitat. It can by propagated from seed or from dividing up the plant. Using cold stratification can cause the germination time speed up from its usual time of around four weeks.
