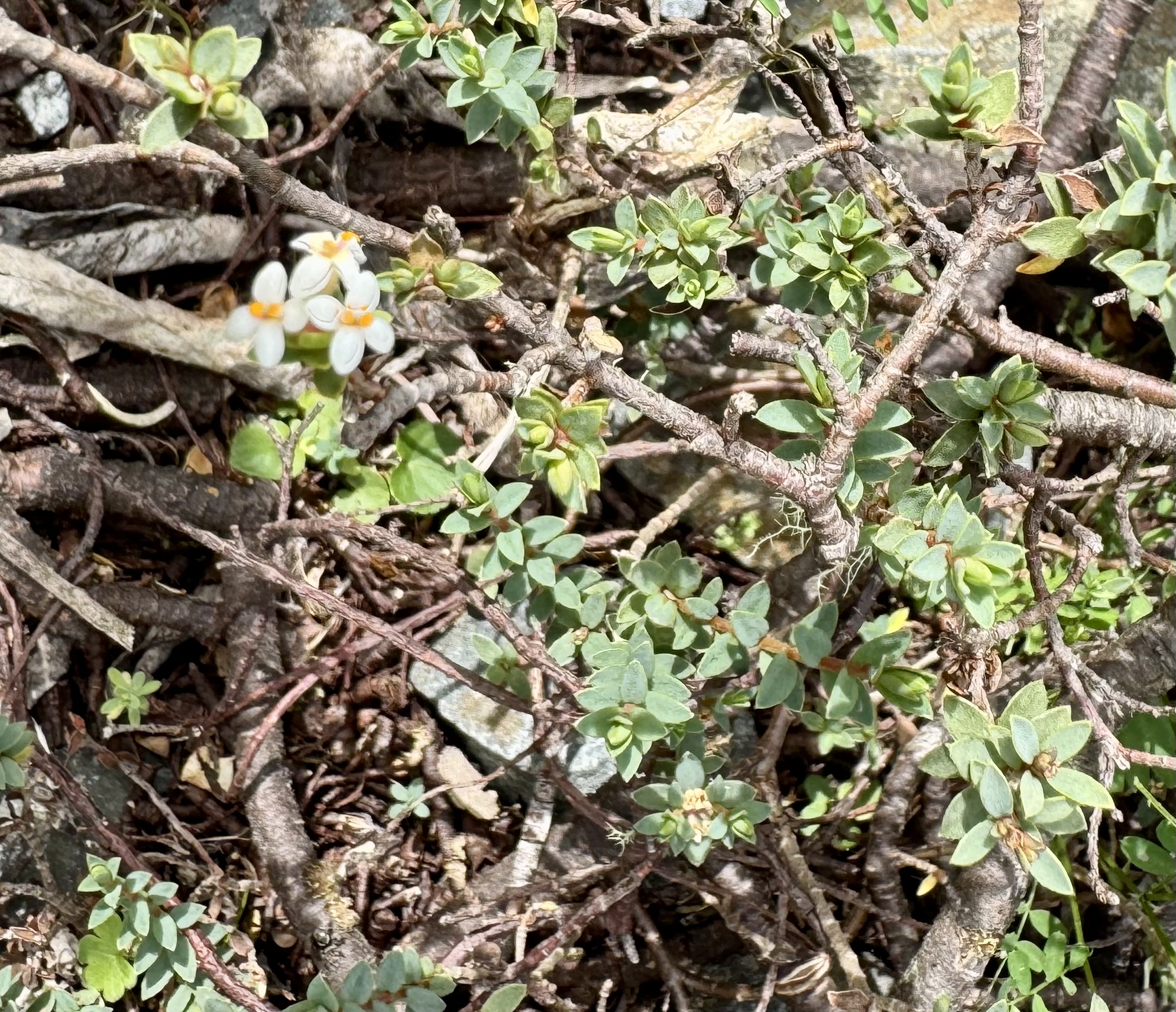
- Pimelea oreophila in flower, Ōtari

Conservation status
- Not Threatened (NZ TCS)

Scientific classification
- Kingdom: Plantae
- Clade: Tracheophytes
- Clade: Angiosperms
- Clade: Eudicots
- Clade: Rosids
- Order: Malvales
- Family: Thymelaeaceae
- Genus: Pimelea
- Species: P. oreophila

Binomial name
- Pimelea oreophila C.J.Burrows

= Pimelea oreophila =

Species of shrub

Pimelea oreophila, commonly known as the mountain loving daphne, is a species of small shrub of the family Thymelaeaceae.

== Description ==
Pimelea oreophila has a prostrate habit. Its stems grow up to 50 cm long and up to 5 mm thick, with leaves that are 8 to 10 mm long having distinct hair-tips and are arranged in opposite rows. Its flowers are hairy and white, and grow in clusters. Fruits are orange or red.

== Distribution and habitat ==
The species is endemic to New Zealand, and found only on the Volcanic Plateau and the mountains between the Kaweka and Ruahine ranges in the North Island and throughout most mountain regions of the South Island. The shrub grows in montane to high alpine areas and found between 500 and 2200 m above sea level. Generally common and the most impoirtant pimelea throughout the tussock grasslands and herbfields, extending into fellfield on sheltered sites. Four subspecies have recently (2011) been recognised, with only slightly overlapping ranges.

== Subspecies ==
- Pimelea oreophila subsp. oreophila
- Pimelea oreophila subsp. lepta
- Pimelea oreophila subsp. hetera
- Pimelea oreophila subsp. ephaistica

== Conservation status ==
Pimelea oreophila is classified as Not Threatened under the New Zealand Threat Classification System (NZTCS) due to being naturally common.
