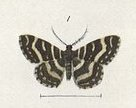

Scientific classification
- Kingdom: Animalia
- Phylum: Arthropoda
- Clade: Pancrustacea
- Class: Insecta
- Order: Lepidoptera
- Family: Geometridae
- Genus: Notoreas
- Species: N. isoleuca

Binomial name
- Notoreas isoleuca Meyrick, 1897

= Notoreas isoleuca =

Species of moth

Notoreas isoleuca is a species of moth in the family Geometridae. It is endemic to New Zealand.

== Taxonomy ==
This species was first described in 1897 by Edward Meyrick using material collected in Castle Hill by George Hudson. Meyrick temporarily suppressed this taxon in 1905 having come to the conclusion that it was a form of N. mechanitis but after a close study of the group Meyrick reinstated it in 1911. Hudson also discussed and illustrated this species in his 1928 book The Butterflies and Moths of New Zealand.

The genus Notoreas was reviewed in 1986 by R. C. Craw and the placement of this species within it was confirmed. However some experts regard this species as being of dubious taxonomic status and in need of further taxonomic investigation. The holotype specimen is held at the Natural History Museum, London.

== Description ==
Meyrick described the species as follows:

♀︎. 20 mm. Head and thorax ochreous-yellow, mixed with black. Forewings with termen bowed, rather oblique; dark fuscous, irregularly sprinkled with yellow; a cloudy transverse streak of yellow irroration near base, and another of yellow and white scales near beyond it, bent near costa; a curved white streak at 1/3, suffused with yellow on costa and in middle; a rather irregular tolerably straight white streak in middle, suffused with yellow towards costa, middle, and dorsum; a white streak at 2/3, obtusely angulated in middle, yellow on costa; subterminal line very fine, yellow, irregular, forming small spots on costa and in middle: cilia white, basal half fuscous. Hindwings as in forewings, but first three streaks obsolete, other two nearer base, post-median curved, hardly angulated.

== Distribution ==
This species is endemic to New Zealand. N. isoleuca has been found around Arthur's Pass and Ben Lomond as well as Mount Peel.

== Life cycle and behaviour ==
This species normally produces two broods per year but it has been hypothesised that at some localities it may produce only once in a season. The female moth lays her eggs within the flower buds of their host plant. When the larvae emerge from their eggs, they eat into the leaves or buds of their host, hiding from predators. Once they are large enough, they emerge to feed from the fresh growth of the plant. N. elegans pupate in a loose cocoon on the ground under their host. The species spends approximately 43 days in their cocoon before emerging as an adult. N. isoleuca are day-flying moths. They are low but fast flyers and constantly vibrate their wings to enable them to take off rapidly.

== Host species ==
The host plants for the larvae of Notoreas isoleuca are endemic species within the genus Kelleria.

== Biology and behaviour ==
This day-flying species is on the wing from January to March.
