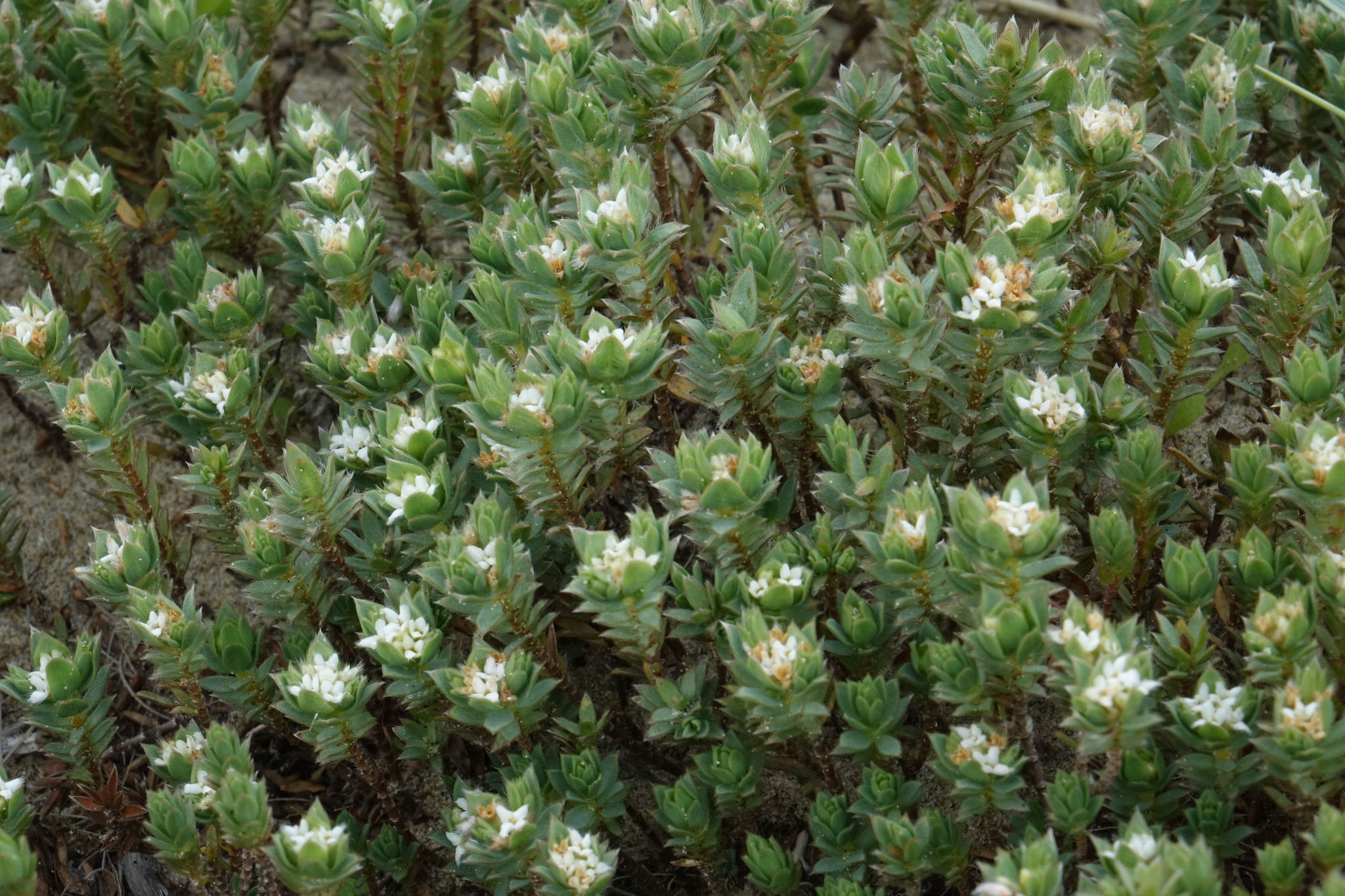

Scientific classification
- Kingdom: Plantae
- Clade: Tracheophytes
- Clade: Angiosperms
- Clade: Eudicots
- Clade: Rosids
- Order: Malvales
- Family: Thymelaeaceae
- Genus: Pimelea
- Species: P. lyallii

Binomial name
- Pimelea lyallii Hook.f.

= Pimelea lyallii =

Species of shrub

Pimelea lyallii, commonly known as the southern sand daphne, is a species of small shrub of the family Thymelaeaceae. It is endemic to New Zealand.

== Description ==
Pimelea lyallii has a prostrate habit. Its stems grow up to 60 centimetres (24 inches) long, with leaves that are 5 to 7 mm long and 2 to 3 mm wide. Its flowers are hairy and white, and grow in clusters. The fruit it produces is also white.

== Distribution and habitat ==
The species is endemic to New Zealand, and found only on the Foveaux Strait and Stewart Island / Rakiura coasts. The shrub grows in coastal sand dunes and is often found partially covered in sand.

== Conservation status ==
Pimelea lyallii is classified as at risk under the New Zealand Threat Classification System (NZTCS) due to being naturally uncommon.
