= Old Man Range =

Mountain range in the southern South Island of New Zealand

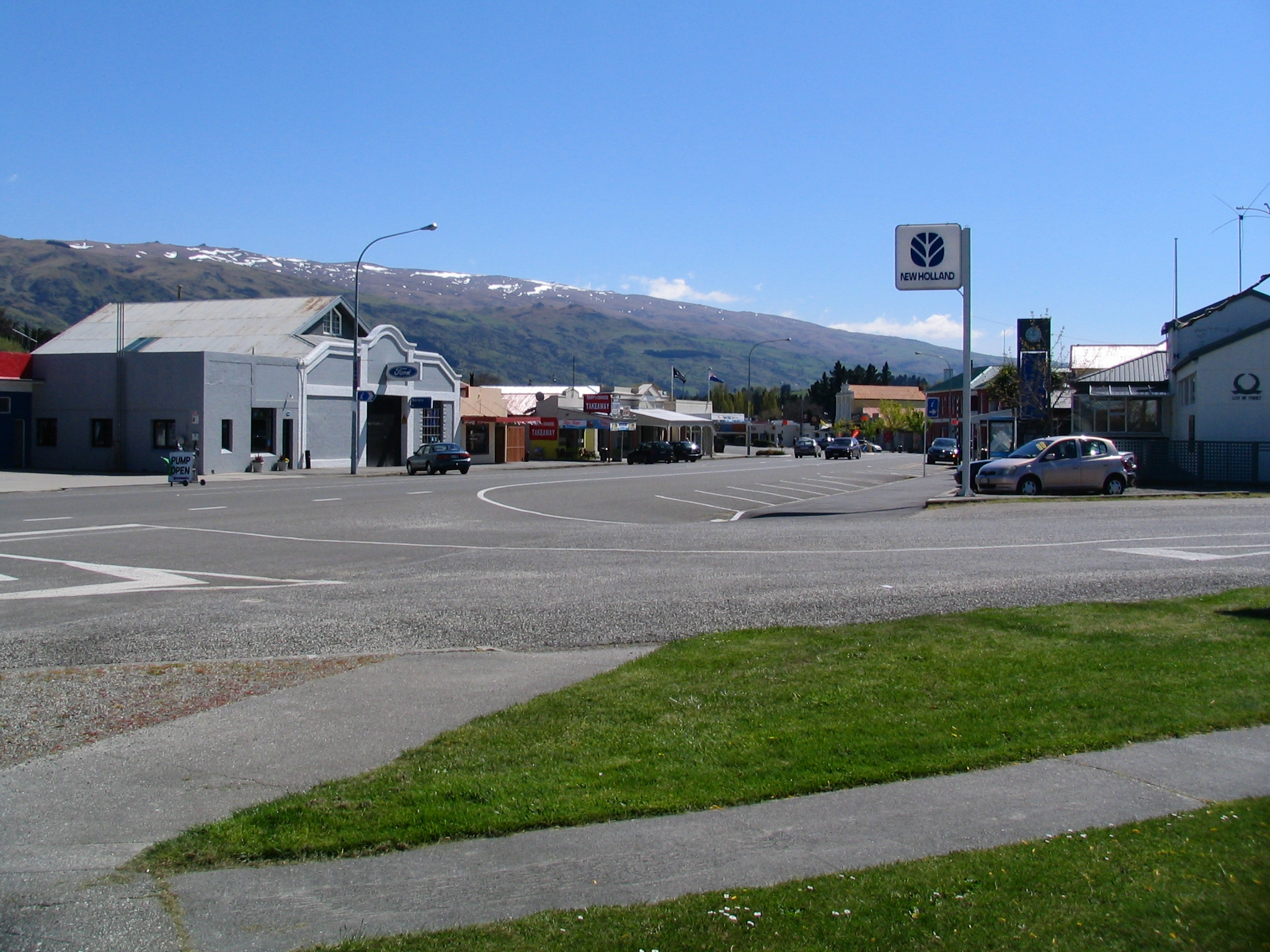
- The Old Man Range as seen from Roxburgh, 20 km to the southeast

Highest point
- Peak: The Obelisk / The Old Man
- Elevation: 1,682 m (5,518 ft)
- Coordinates: 45°19′22″S 169°12′27″E

Geography
- Location within New Zealand
- Country: New Zealand
- Range coordinates: 45°20′S 169°10′E
- Topo map: GNS Science

Geology
- Mountain type: Mountain Range

The Old Man Range, also called Kopuwai, is a mountain range in Central Otago, in the South Island of New Zealand. It lies to the west of the valley of the Clutha River, close to the town of Alexandra and the artificial Lake Roxburgh. The range stretches north-south for a distance of some 40 kilometres (25 mi). Part of the range forms the border between the Otago and Southland Regions. The range's Māori name, Kopuwai, means "Water Swallower", and was the name of a mythical giant who lived in the area.

The range rises to a narrow ridge at a height of just over 1,500 metres (4,900 ft). The highest points are the 1,682 metres (5,518 ft) Obelisk (also known as The Old Man, and from which the range gets its name) at (45°19′22″S 169°12′27″E), and Hyde Rock (1,673 metres (5,489 ft)). The eastern flanks of the range are steep, falling away to the Clutha Valley. In contrast, the western flanks fall gently to a high plateau before rising to a lower ridge known as the Old Woman Range. The plateau which has areas of both bare rock and marsh, is the source of numerous creeks, most of them part of the catchment of the young Waikaia and Earnscleugh Rivers.

The geology of the range is dominated by the schists of the Caples and Torlesse Terranes. The rock is a source of gold, and the area was worked during the Otago gold rush of the 1860s. Several remnants of the mining era can still be seen in the range.

Much of the range is conservation land controlled by the New Zealand Department of Conservation (DOC), and divided between the Kopuwai and Bain Block Conservation Areas.

Two more, much smaller, ranges of this name exist in New Zealand — a low range of hills in inland Canterbury, between Lakes Pukaki and Alexandrina, and a higher hill range in the Tasman District, close to Farewell Spit.
