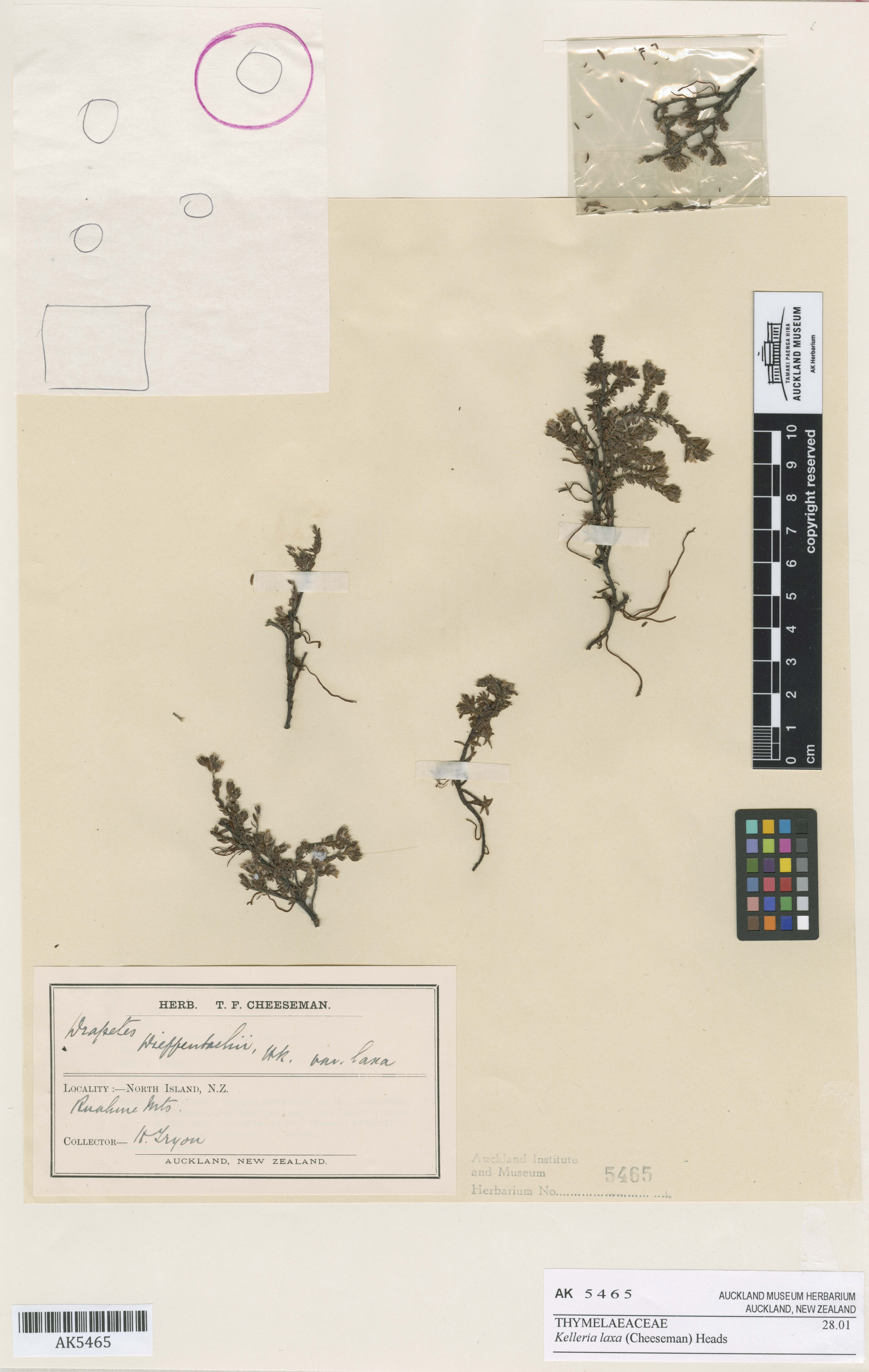
- Kelleria laxa herbarium specimen

Scientific classification
- Kingdom: Plantae
- Clade: Tracheophytes
- Clade: Angiosperms
- Clade: Eudicots
- Clade: Rosids
- Order: Malvales
- Family: Thymelaeaceae
- Subfamily: Thymelaeoideae
- Genus: Kelleria; Endl. (1848)

= Kelleria =

Genus of shrubs

Kelleria is a genus of miniature shrubs in the family Thymelaeaceae, found in southeastern Australia, New Zealand, New Guinea, and Borneo. The centre of species biodiversity is the Lammermoor Range in Central Otago, NZ.

== Species ==
Species accepted by the Plants of the World Online as of September 2024:

- Kelleria bogongensis C.E.Marks
- Kelleria childii Heads
- Kelleria croizatii Heads
- Kelleria dieffenbachii (Hook.) Endl.
- Kelleria ericoides (Hook.f.) Domke
- Kelleria laxa (Cheeseman) Heads
- Kelleria lyallii (Hook.f.) Berggr.
- Kelleria multiflora (Cheeseman) Heads
- Kelleria paludosa Heads
- Kelleria tessellata Heads
- Kelleria villosa Berggr.
