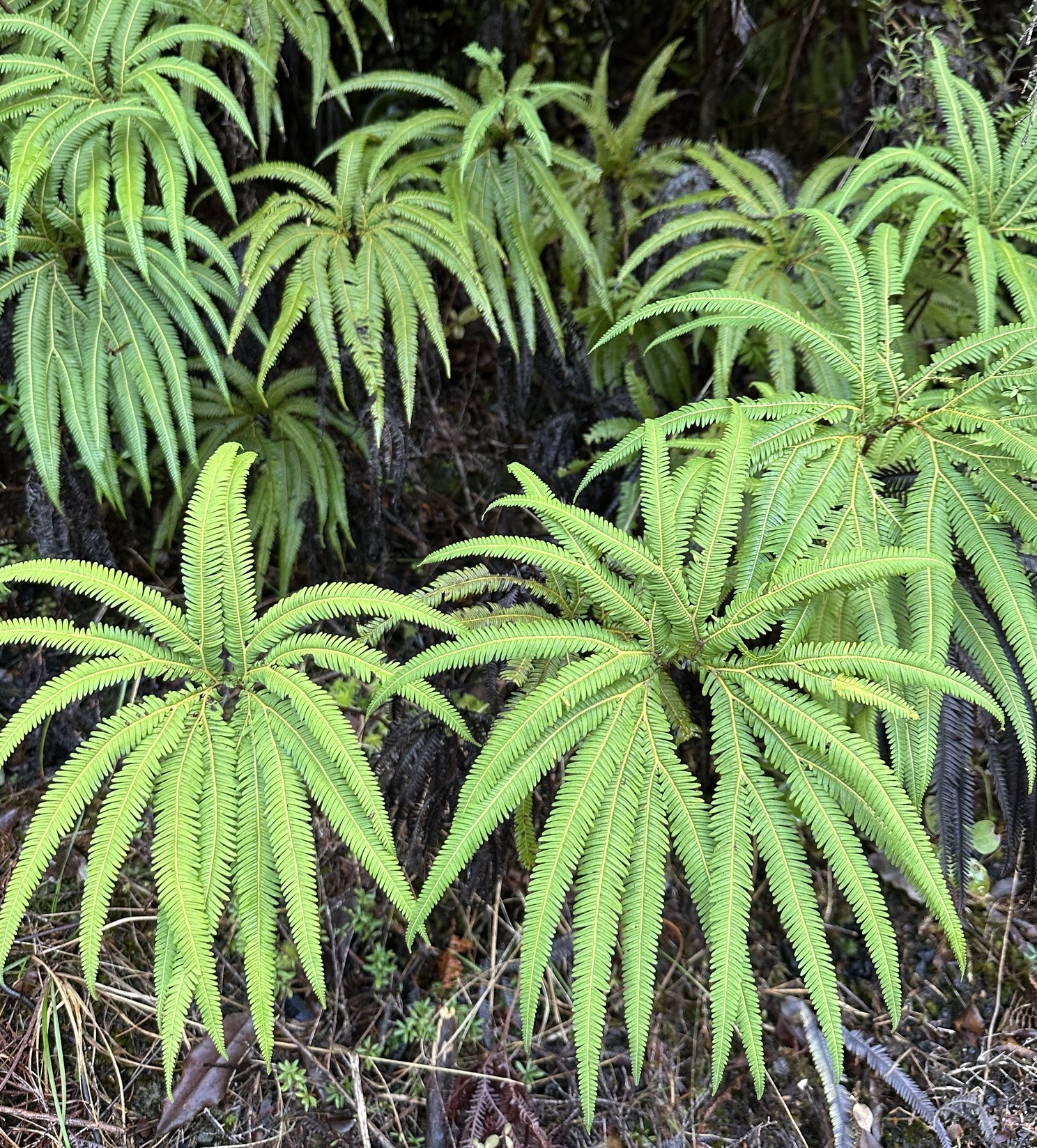
- On the Croesus Track, Paparoa Range

Scientific classification
- Kingdom: Plantae
- Clade: Tracheophytes
- Division: Polypodiophyta
- Class: Polypodiopsida
- Order: Gleicheniales
- Family: Gleicheniaceae
- Genus: Sticherus
- Species: S. cunninghamii

Binomial name
- Sticherus cunninghamii (Heward ex Hook.) Ching

Synonyms
- Gleichenia cunninghamii

= Sticherus cunninghamii =

Species of fern endemic to New Zealand

Sticherus cunninghamii, also known as umbrella fern, is a New Zealand endemic fern.

The species is named after English botanist and explorer Allan Cunningham; its Māori names include rarauheriki, waekura and tapuwae-kōtuku.

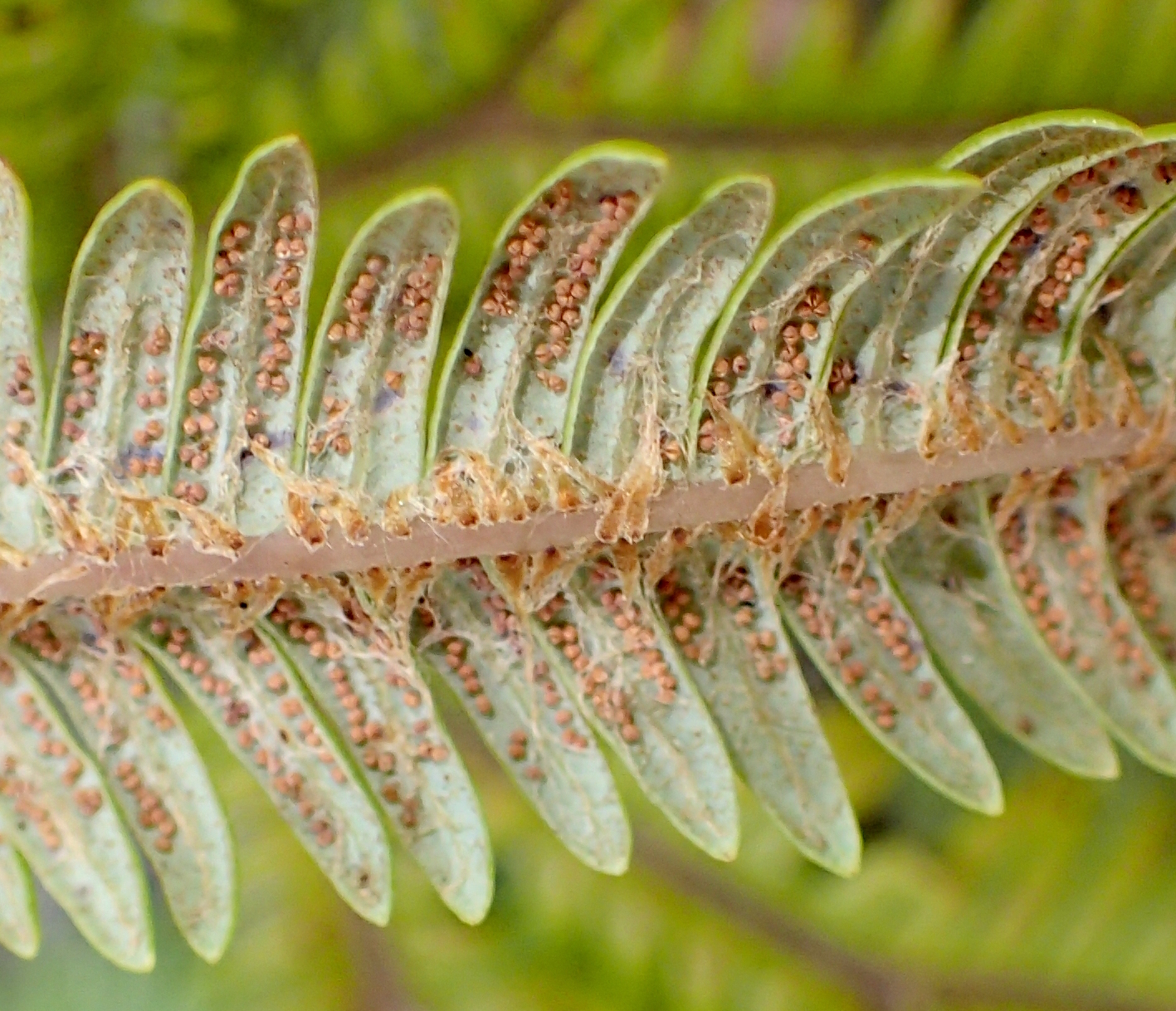
Underside of leaf segments showing sporangia

Umbrella fern is characterised by its drooping fronds that resemble an umbrella, distinct from the fan-like fronds of its relative S. flabellatus. The angle between the first branches on the frond is narrow, about 44°. Fronds are 15–30 cm long with an erect stipe between 20 and 50 cm high, but reaching 1 m at times.The last, longest leaf segment on the frond is up to 18 mm, and unlike in S. flabellatus is not serrated. Leaves are divided into two halves which fan out, with a dormant bud between them which sometimes grows into additional pinnae, especially in plants growing along the ground rather than up banks. The underside of the leaf segments is white or glaucous, and is covered with broad scales which are brown in the centre and fade to pale on the margins. Sori are found in one row each side of the midrib, have around five sporangia, and spores measure 29–31 μm by 14–15 μm.

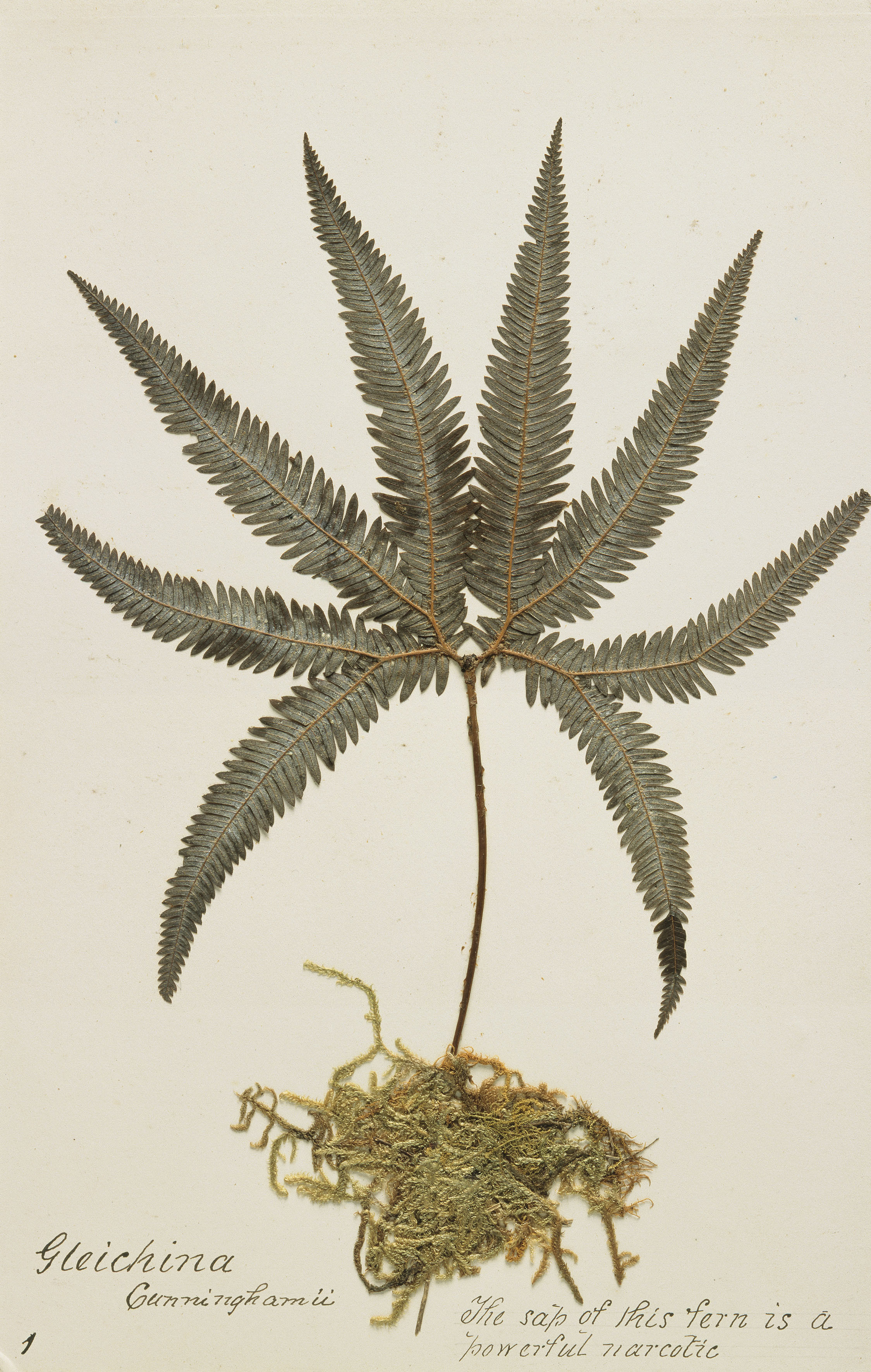
1888 pressed specimen from the fern collection of King Tāwhiao

This fern grows in patches from a long creeping rhizome, which is much-branched and is covered with dark brown scales. The fronds characteristically rise into two or three tiers of "umbrellas".

S. cunninghami is endemic to New Zealand, and is common in the North Island, particularly in the central volcanic area, but rarer in the eastern and southern parts of the South Island and in Stewart Island and the Auckland Islands. It occurs from lowland to montane forest, usually along shaded stream banks and road cuttings where it can form the main ground cover.

The fern is used in traditional Māori rongoā herbal medicine; one specimen collected in 1888 for King Tāwhiao is annotated "the sap of this fern is a powerful narcotic". The plant is very difficult to transplant and cultivate.
