= Yerba Loza =

Yerba Loza may refer to the following fern species:

- Gleichenia cryptocarpa
- Gleichenia quadripartita
- Gleichenia squamulosa
