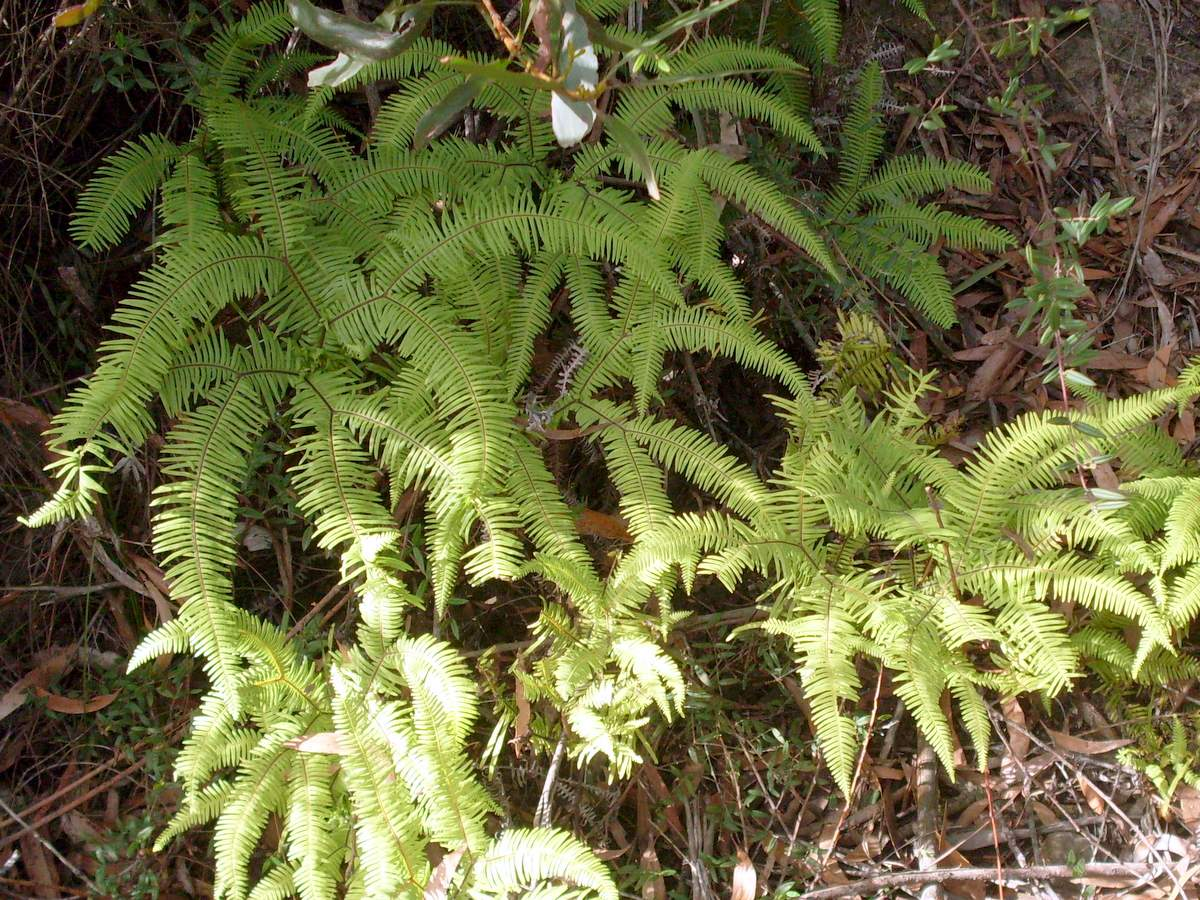
- Spreading fan fern at Mount Budawang, Australia

Scientific classification
- Kingdom: Plantae
- Clade: Embryophytes
- Clade: Tracheophytes
- Division: Polypodiophyta
- Class: Polypodiopsida
- Order: Gleicheniales
- Family: Gleicheniaceae
- Genus: Sticherus
- Species: S. lobatus

Binomial name
- Sticherus lobatus N.A.Wakef.

Synonyms
- Gleichenia lobata (N.A.Wakef.) S.L.Thrower

= Sticherus lobatus =

Spreading fan fern

Species of fern

Sticherus lobatus, known as the spreading fan fern, is a fern found in eastern and southern Australia. It is a common and attractive plant, similar to S. flabellatus but with additional lobed segments. It often forms colonies in open forest areas or on the edge of rainforests.
