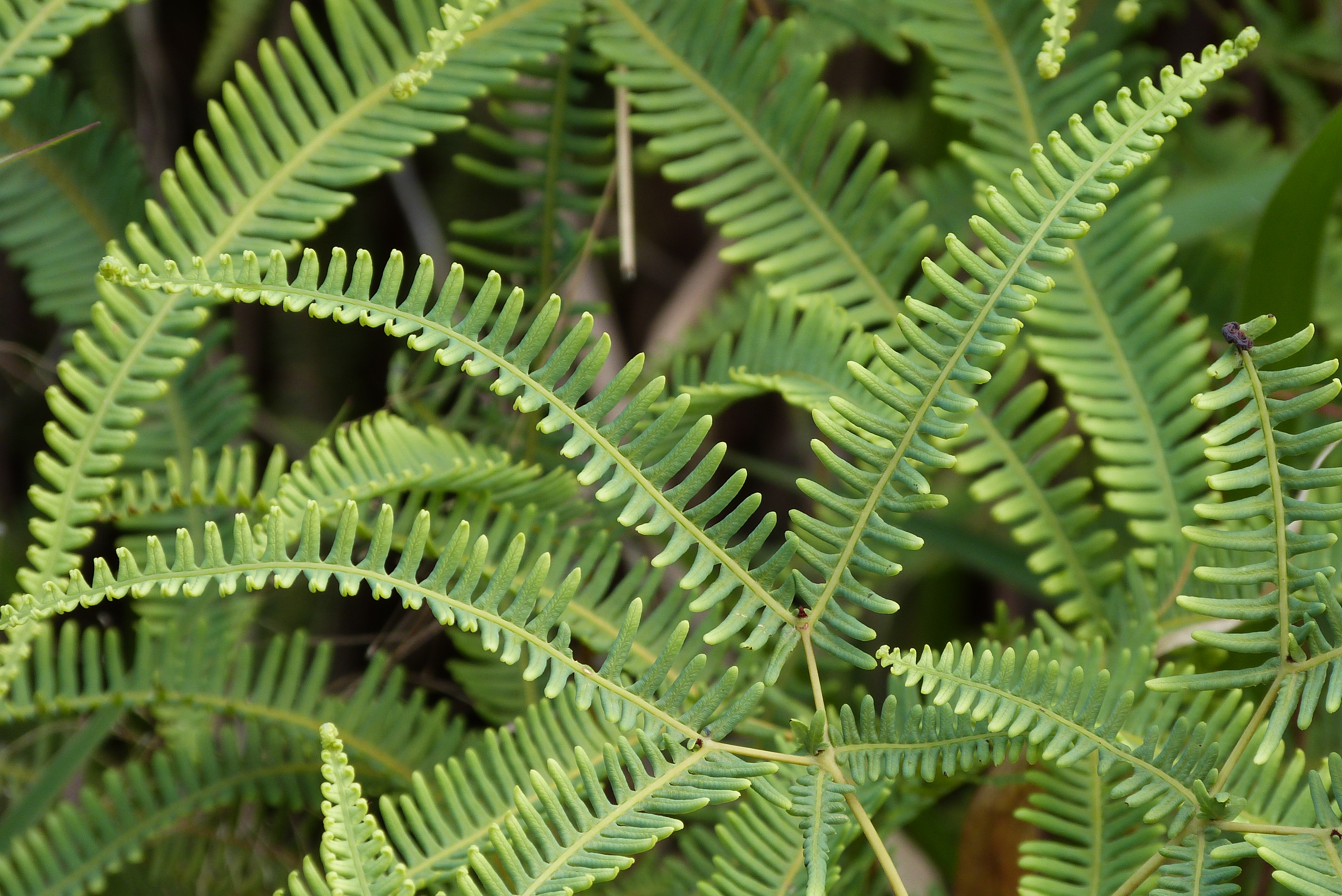

Scientific classification
- Kingdom: Plantae
- Clade: Tracheophytes
- Division: Polypodiophyta
- Class: Polypodiopsida
- Order: Gleicheniales
- Family: Gleicheniaceae
- Genus: Dicranopteris
- Species: D. flexuosa

Binomial name
- Dicranopteris flexuosa (Schrad.) Underw.

= Dicranopteris flexuosa =

Species of plant

Dicranopteris flexuosa (commonly known as the drooping forked-fern) is a species of tropical fern in the family Gleicheniaceae, widely distributed across the Neotropics. Like other members of its genus, it is known for forming dense thickets in disturbed and open habitats, playing a key ecological role in tropical and subtropical forests by stabilizing soil, moderating microclimates, and promoting forest succession through rapid clonal growth and stress tolerance. Though often removed in forest management due to its dense growth, D. flexuosa may enhance ecosystem recovery by protecting soil and influencing plant community development.

== Distribution ==
Dicranopteris flexuosa is widely distributed throughout tropical and subtropical regions of the Neotropics, including South America, Central America and the Caribbean. It is also native to Mexico and even the Southern United States.
