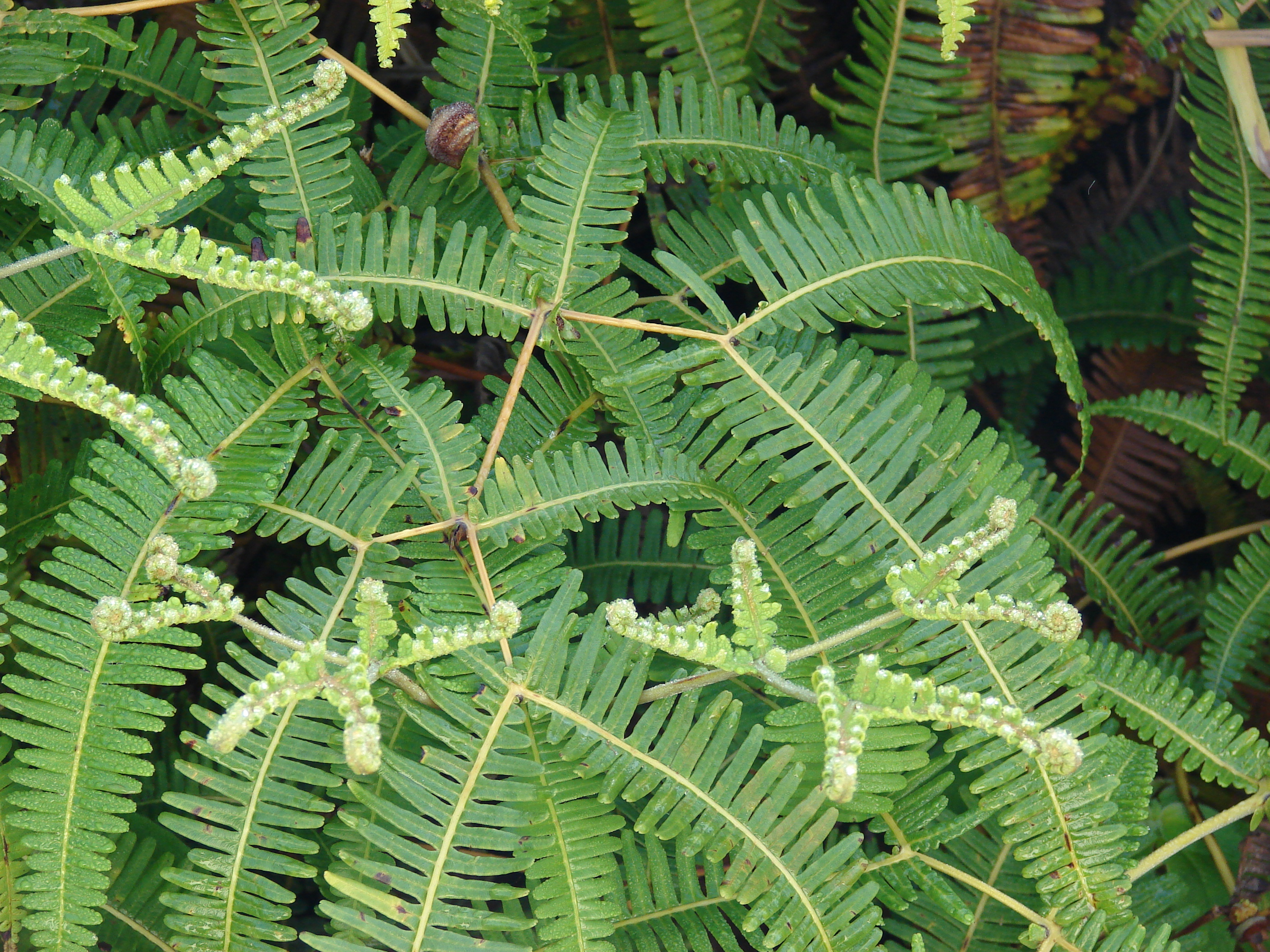

Conservation status
- Least Concern (IUCN 3.1)

Scientific classification
- Kingdom: Plantae
- Clade: Tracheophytes
- Division: Polypodiophyta
- Class: Polypodiopsida
- Order: Gleicheniales
- Family: Gleicheniaceae
- Genus: Dicranopteris
- Species: D. linearis

Binomial name
- Dicranopteris linearis (Burm.f.) Underw.

Synonyms
- 38 synonyms: Dicranopteris discolor (Schrad.) Nakai; Dicranopteris hermannii (R.Br.) Nakai; Dicranopteris klotzschii (Hook.) Ching; Dicranopteris linearis var. brevis Manickam & Irudarajay; Dicranopteris linearis var. crassifrons (Alderw.) Holttum; Dicranopteris linearis var. inaequiloba B.K.Nayar & Geev.; Dicranopteris linearis var. longicauda (Christ) Nakai; Dicranopteris linearis var. major (T.Moore) Nakai; Dicranopteris linearis var. tenuis Manickam & Irudarajay; Gleichenia dichotoma var. bipinnatifida T.Moore; Gleichenia dichotoma var. major T.Moore; Gleichenia discolor (Schrad.) Sehnem; Gleichenia hermannii R.Br.; Gleichenia klotzschii Hook.; Gleichenia linearis (Burm.f.) C.B.Clarke; Gleichenia linearis f. crenulata Rosenst.; Gleichenia linearis var. crassifrons Alderw.; Gleichenia linearis var. grandis Christ; Gleichenia linearis var. irregularis Alderw.; Gleichenia linearis var. longicauda Christ; Gleichenia mucronata Reinw.; Gleichenia pteridifolia Ces.; Gleichenia rigida Griff.; Gleichenia rigida J.Sm.; Mertensia cumingiana C.Presl; Mertensia discolor Schrad.; Mertensia hermannii (R.Br.) Poir.; Mertensia klotzschii Brack.; Mertensia lessonii A.Rich.; Mertensia linearis (Burm.f.) Fritsch; Mertensia pteridifolia C.Presl; Mertensia rigida J.Sm.; Mertensia sieberi C.Presl; Platyzoma ferrugineum Desv.; Platyzoma latum Desv.; Polypodium lineare Burm.f.; Pteris platyferra Christenh.; Pteris platylata Christenh.

= Dicranopteris linearis =

Species of plant

Dicranopteris linearis is a common species of fern known by many common names, including Old World forked fern, uluhe (Hawaiian), and dilim (Filipino). It is one of the most widely distributed ferns of the wet Old World tropics and adjacent regions, including Polynesia and the Pacific. In parts of the New World tropics its niche is filled by its relative, Dicranopteris pectinatus.

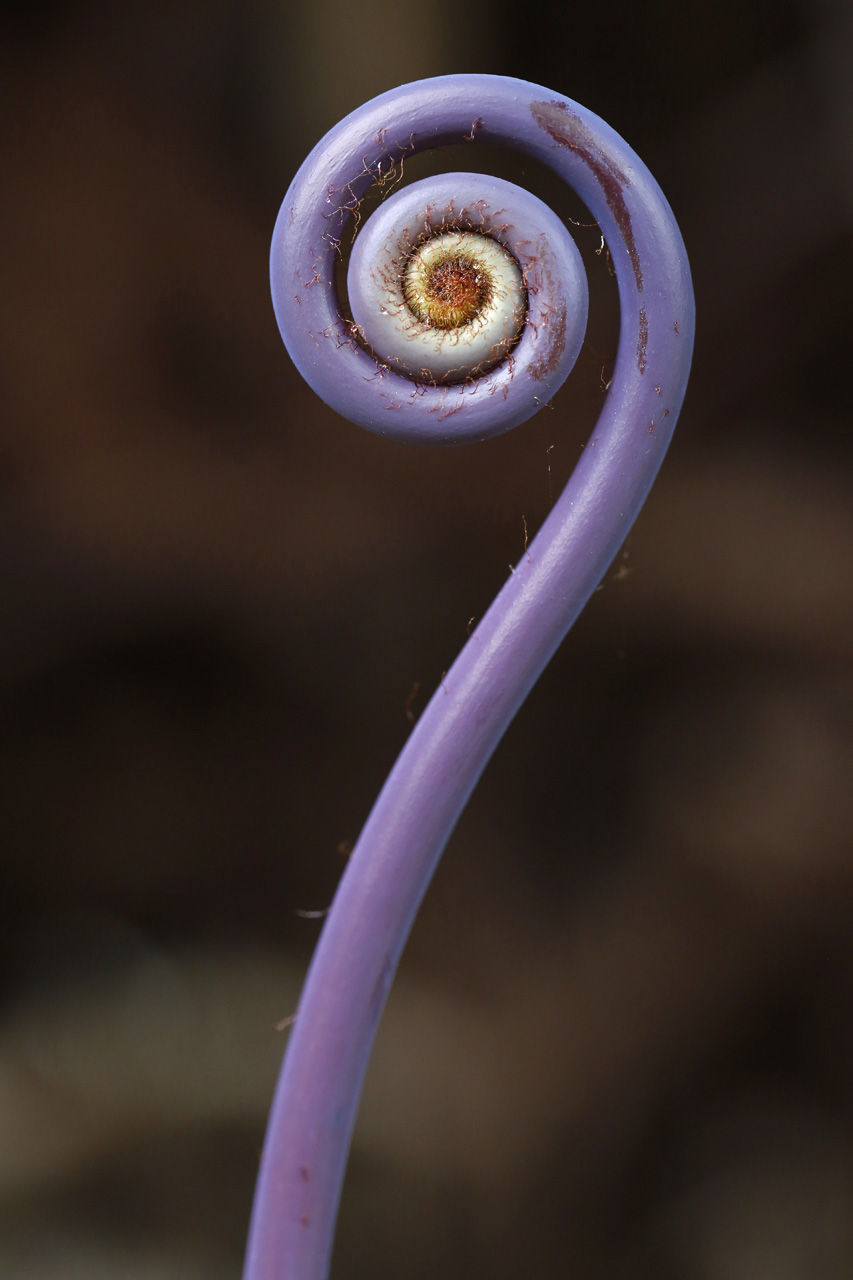
Frond closup

This rhizomatous fern spreads via cloning, spreading along the ground and climbing on other vegetation, often forming thickets 3 metres deep or more. The stem grows from the rhizome, branches at a 45° angle, and forms fronds that continue to bud and branch. In this way the growth can continue for a long distance as the plant forms a mat, grows over itself in layers, and spreads. When climbing, the leafy branches can reach over 6 metres long and can climb 10 meters high when supported by a tree. The ultimate segments of the leaves are linear in shape, up to 7 centimeters long by a few millimeters wide. The undersides are hairy and sometimes waxy. It can also reproduce via spores.

The fern grows easily on poorly drained, nutrient-poor soils and in disturbed habitats and steep slopes. It does not tolerate shade, so once established it will eventually be shaded out by taller vegetation unless it climbs above it. It may suppress the growth of new stands of trees, especially when it becomes a dense thicket.

The fern is a keystone species in Hawaiian ecosystems, and dominates many areas in Hawaiian rainforests. It occurs on all the main Hawaiian islands. As a pioneer species in ecological succession, it can colonize bare sites such as lava flows, talus, and abandoned roads. When the fern grows onto a new site it produces layers of stems and leaves repeatedly until there is a network of vegetation. The leaves die and the stems are very slow to decompose, so the network persists. The network then fills with organic forest detritus, forming a litter layer which can be a meter thick. The network is penetrated by the fern's rhizomes and roots, such that the fern serves as its own substrate. Where the fern is eliminated, invasive species of plants can move in, so one important benefit of the fern may be the prevention of these plants from encroaching on the rainforest. The fern may have allelopathic effects, preventing the growth of other plants. Also, the fern is a very productive member of the forest ecosystem; despite being a relatively small amount of the biomass in the forest it accounts for over half of the primary productivity in some areas.

This plant is used medicinally to treat intestinal worms in Indochina, skin ulcers and wounds in New Guinea, and fever in Malaysia. In vitro samples of the fern kill bacteria.

The fiddleheads of the fern are used in floral arrangements.
