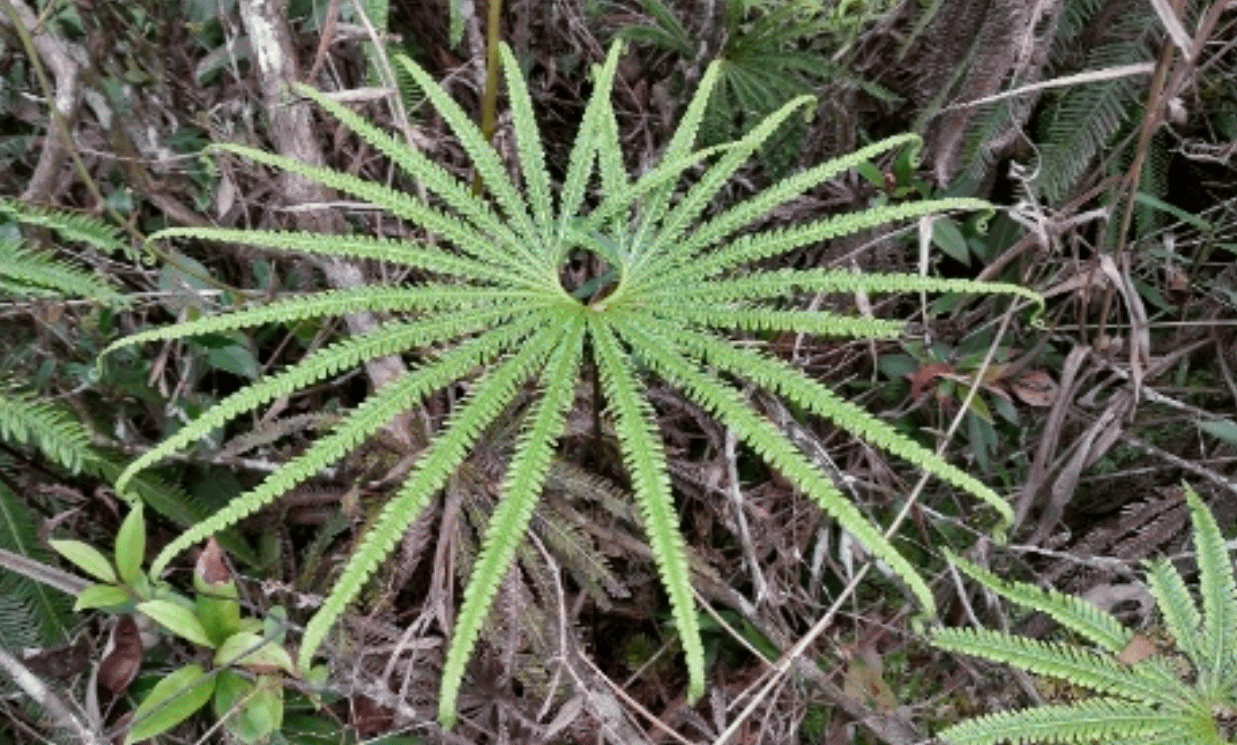
- Matonia pectinata

Scientific classification
- Kingdom: Plantae
- Clade: Tracheophytes
- Division: Polypodiophyta
- Class: Polypodiopsida
- Order: Gleicheniales
- Family: Matoniaceae
- Genus: Matonia; R.Br.

Type species
- Matonia pectinata R.Br.

Synonyms
- Prionopteris Wall.

= Matonia =

Matonia Temporal range: Early Jurassic–Recent

Genus of ferns

Matonia is a genus of fern, named for English botanist William George Maton. It is native to Thailand, Malesia (the Malayan peninsula, Borneo, Sumatra, Maluku and the Philippines) and New Guinea.

As of October 2019, Plants of the World Online and the Checklist of Ferns and Lycophytes of the World accept two extant species:

- Matonia pectinata R.Br.
- Matonia foxworthyi Copel.

Matonia sarmentosa is now placed in the genus Phanerosorus as Phanerosorus sarmentosus (Baker) Copel.

Matonia has a fossil record extending back to the earliest part of the Jurassic period, with Matonia braunii being known from the Hettangian aged Mecsek Coal Formation of Hungary and Zagaje Formation of Poland.
