= Ampe =

Ampe may refer to:

- Ampe (game), a Ghanaian children's game which involves jumping and clapping of hands.
- Gleichenia cryptocarpa, a fern with a natural distribution in Chile
- Lophosoria quadripinnata, a fern found in the Americas
- Els Ampe (* 1979), Belgian politician
- Francis Ampe (* 1944), French politician
