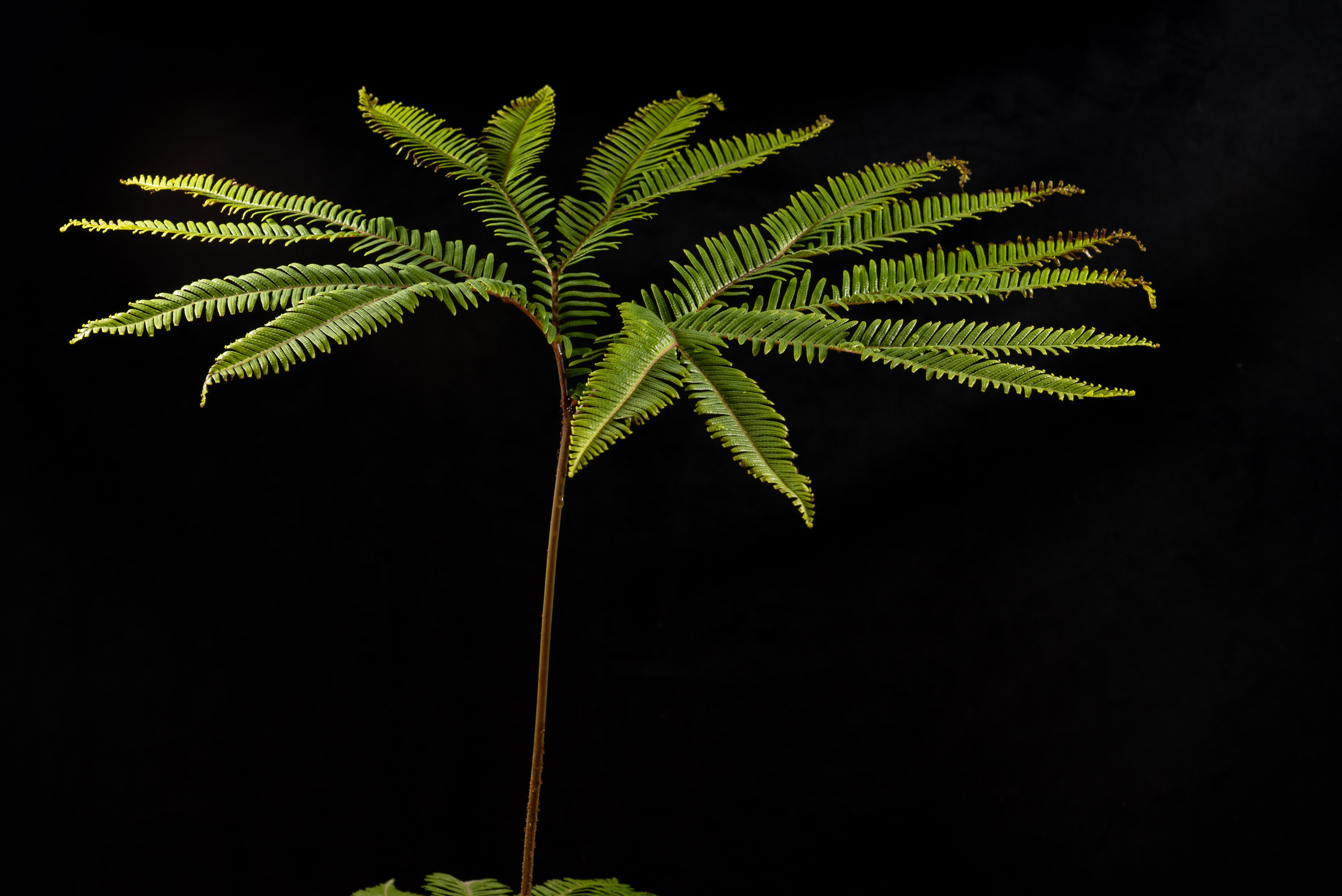

Scientific classification
- Kingdom: Plantae
- Clade: Tracheophytes
- Division: Polypodiophyta
- Class: Polypodiopsida
- Order: Gleicheniales
- Family: Gleicheniaceae
- Genus: Sticherus
- Species: S. tener

Binomial name
- Sticherus tener (R.Br.) Ching

Synonyms
- Gleichenia tenera R.Br.; Mertensia tenera (R.Br.) Poir.; Gleichenia flabellate var. tenera (R.Br.) Hook.fil.

= Sticherus tener =

Australian fern

Sticherus tener, also known as silky fan-fern, is a common native ground-fern in the family Gleicheniaceae. It occurs growing along watercourses and drainage lines in rainforest that are dominated by Nothofagus cunninghamii. In Australia, it occurs in the states of Tasmania and Victoria. In New Zealand, it is known from two disjoint regions on the South Island. Like in other members of this genus, Sticherus tener have bright green fronds with repeatedly forking branches, branches bearing linear-shaped segments at almost right angles to the axis and form umbrella-like bush colony.

== Description ==
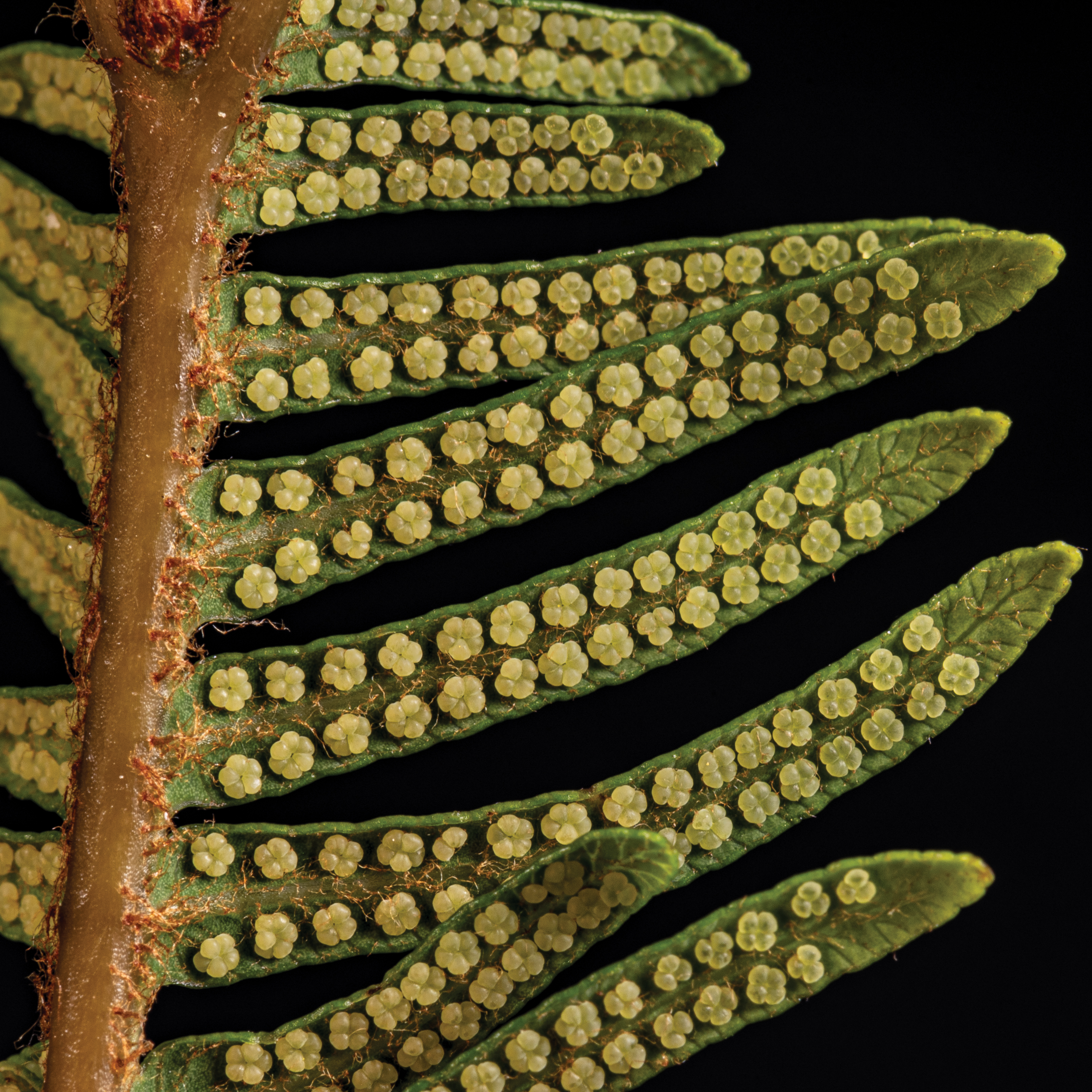
Rows of sori arranged on underside of ultimate segments of Sticherus tener

Sticherus tener are stout ground-fern that grow more than 2 m tall and form bushy colonies. Rhizomes are dark brown covered with brown scaly hairs, long and creeping, and are 4 mm thick and can reach 2 m in length. Fronds are yellow green or green, 200 – 380 mm tall that are dichotomously and repeatedly divided till pinnate laminas. Stipes arise from nearly 50 mm apart along rhizomes, are stiff and erect that are 12-90 cm in length, black and covered in scaly hairs at base that gradually change from reddish brown to green and glabrous at upper section. Pinnae are fan-shaped, 90-190 mm long and 45-260 mm wide, with a pair of primary branches at the stipe apex, which pseudodichotomously branched up to 4 times and ending in resulting 21-43 pairs of ultimate segments. Minor rachises are light to dark brown on ventral surfaces and sparsely covered with brown and narrow scaly hairs. Rachis buds are situated at the apex of stipe and between the primary branches and are covered with light or reddish-brown ciliates; and dormant buds (which rarely develops) are situated at apex of each axis. Segments on the primary branches are of uniform size and coverage, and narrowly oblong, 10-22 mm long, 1.5-3 mm wide and arising from axis at near right angles (75-90°). Sori are 3 -11 and arranged in single row in either side of segment midvein, each containing 3-5 large sporangia.

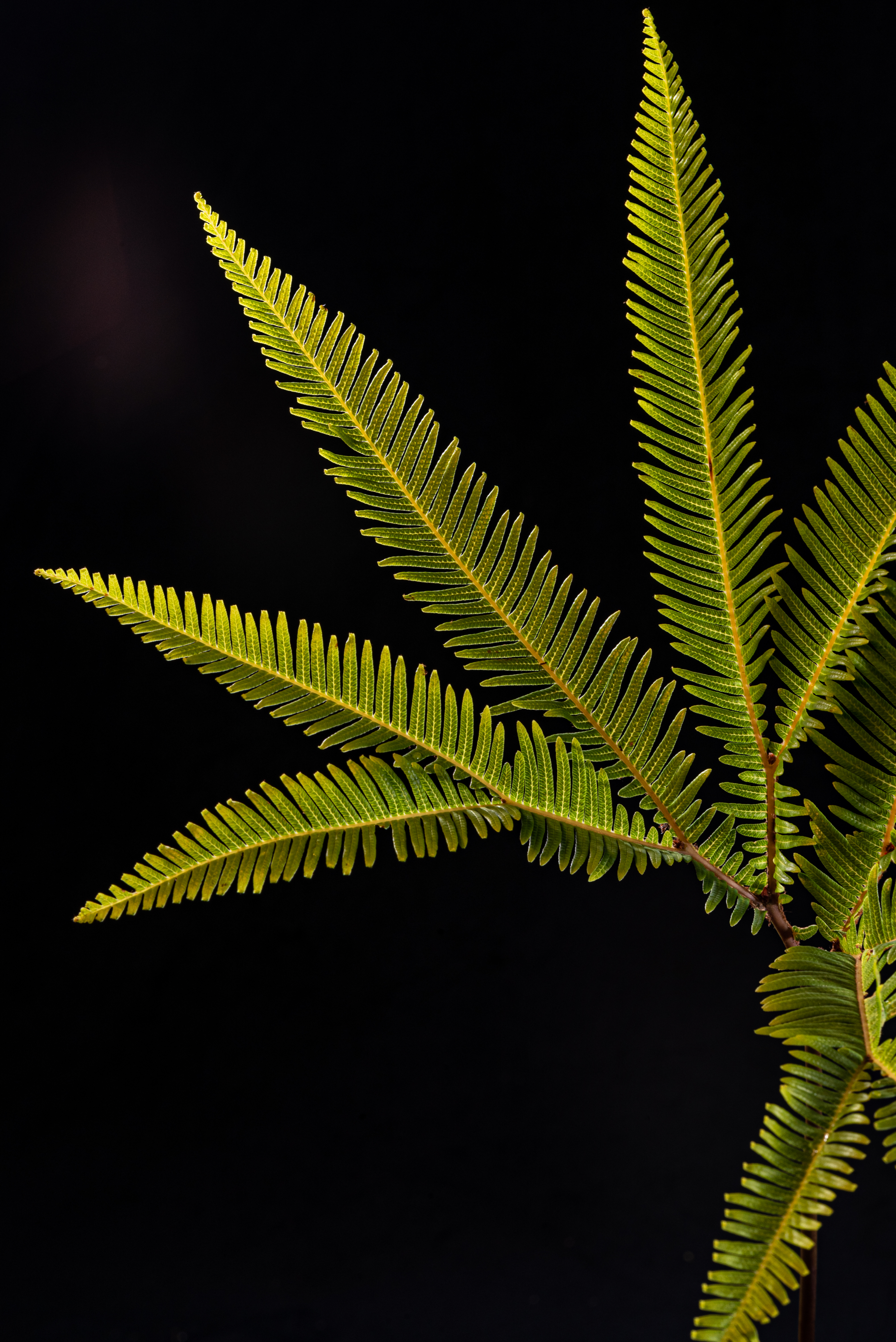
Branching of Sticherus tener fronds, showing dormant buds on end of axis.

The distinguishing feature of Stecherus tener from other species are the segments on the ultimate branches that arise from the mid-rib at near right angles; the under-surface of minor rachis is covered in narrow, brown, and heavily fringed scales, and the underside of ultimate segments are sparsely covered with pale-brown hairs, which may become glabrous with age.

== Taxonomy and naming ==
The name Sticherus is derived from the Greek word sticheres, meaning in rows, referring to the arrangement of spore clusters or sori on the underside of the segments. The species name tener is named using Latin word tener, meaning soft and delicate, referring to the soft texture of the fronds. The common name for this species, Silky Fan Fern, is in reference to the distinguishing features like the soft texture of the fronds and the fan-shaped appearance of the lamina.

Sticherus tener was first described by Garrett et al. (1998) during the investigation of Sticherus species in southeast Australia. The study recognized S. urceolatus as different species and was segregated from S. tener, as a new species. S. tener is recognized and distinguished from other species by the presence of segments on the ultimate branches arising at near right angles to the costa and segments being always present on the primary branches.

== Distribution and habitat ==
Sticherus tener is found in the states of Tasmania and Victoria in Australia, and in the South Island of New Zealand. In Tasmania, Sticherus tener is widespread and common throughout the state, but more abundant in the western region compared to the east. In Victoria, it is more restricted to the Otways and Powelltown regions and less common in other region of the state. There are additional records of Stecherus tener along the coastal regions of New South Wales and a single record near Townsville in Queensland, but these records require further proper and authenticated information sources. In New Zealand, Sticherus tener is found in two disjunct regions on the South Island. These two regions comprise Stockton and Denniston Plateaus near Westport and on Resolution and Anchor Islands and Mt. Hodges in Fiordland.

Sticherus tener are found growing in abundance in permanently damp soils along water courses and drainage lines within rainforest in Tasmania, which is mostly dominated by Nothofagus cunningghamii. In New Zealand, Sticherus tener are found growing in sandstone overhangs and on steep banks with low woody vegetation on Stockton and Denniston Plateaus and on poor soils of scrub, low or mixed forest that extend to tall beech or podocarp forest on Resolution and Anchor Islands and Mt Hodges.
