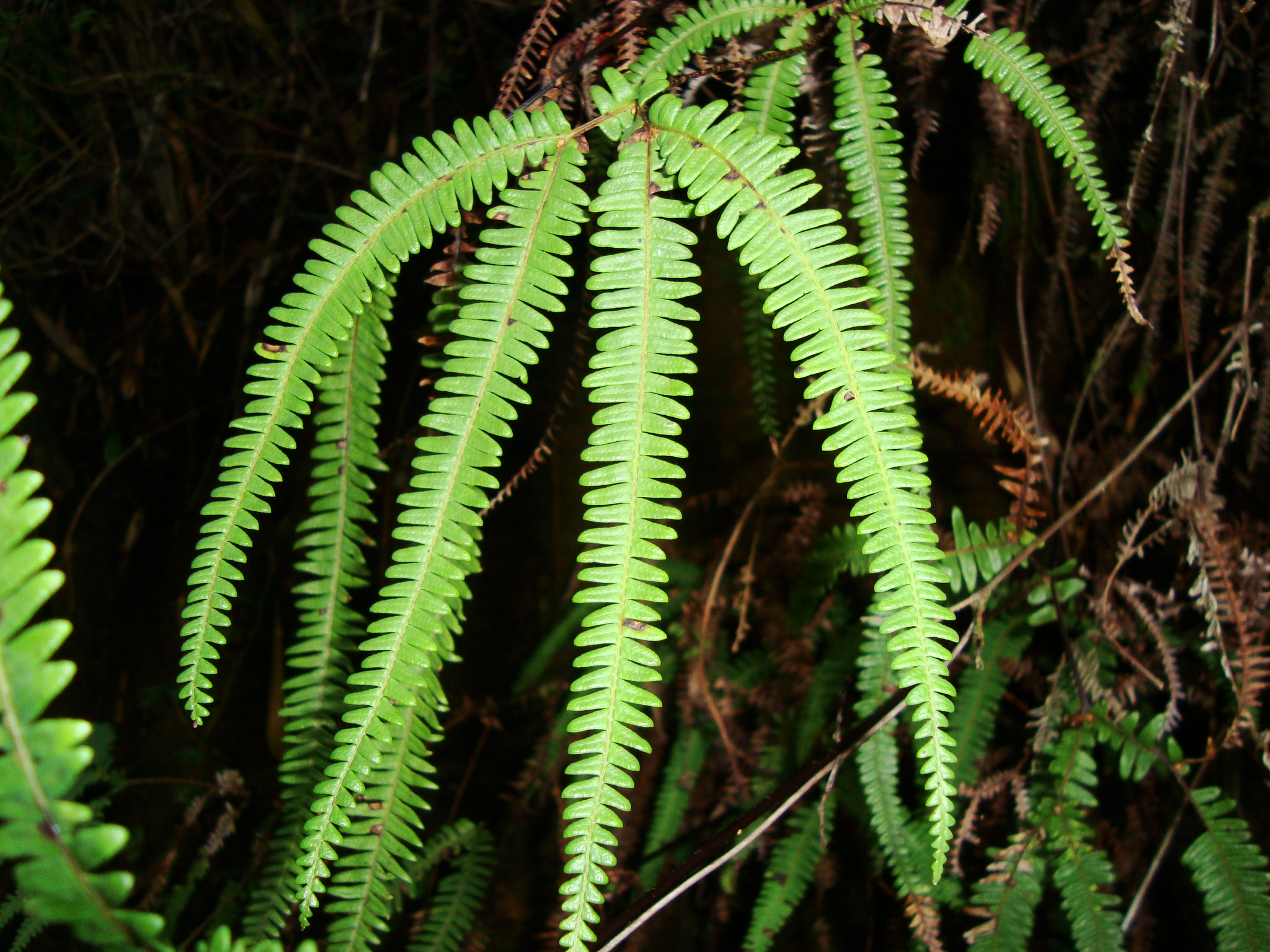

Scientific classification
- Kingdom: Plantae
- Clade: Tracheophytes
- Division: Polypodiophyta
- Class: Polypodiopsida
- Order: Gleicheniales
- Family: Gleicheniaceae
- Genus: Gleichenia
- Species: G. squamulosa

Binomial name
- Gleichenia squamulosa Moore

= Gleichenia squamulosa =

Species of fern

Gleichenia squamulosa known locally as yerba loza, palmita and huadahue, is a fern endemic to Chile with a natural distribution ranging from Maule Region (~35° S) in the north to Aysén Region (~47° S) in the south including the Juan Fernández Islands. It is found from sea level up to 1500 m.a.s.l. and occurs in humid areas that are not too shady.
