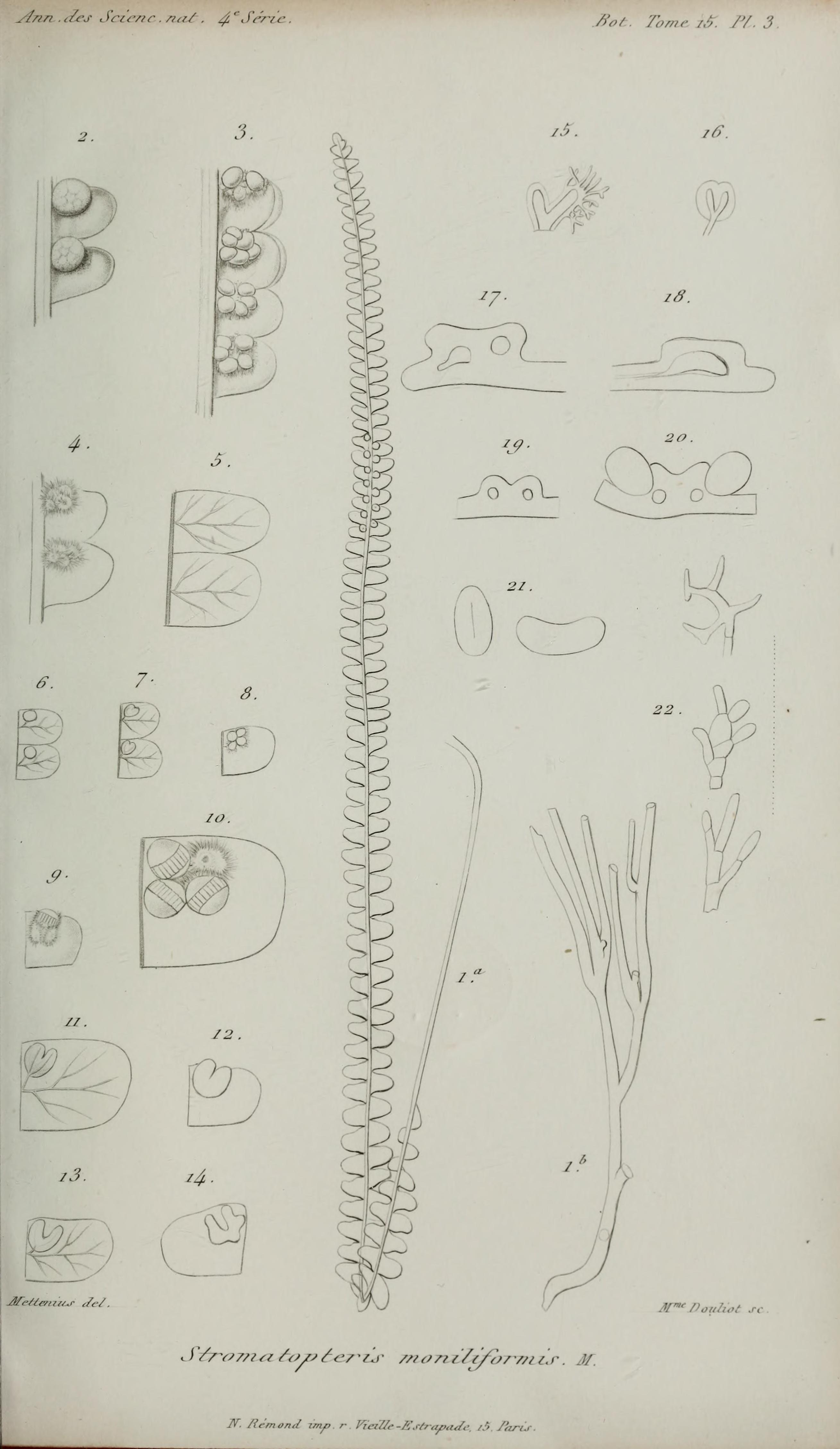
- Stromatopteris moniliformis

Scientific classification
- Kingdom: Plantae
- Clade: Tracheophytes
- Division: Polypodiophyta
- Class: Polypodiopsida
- Order: Gleicheniales
- Family: Gleicheniaceae
- Genus: Stromatopteris; Mett.
- Species: S. moniliformis

Binomial name
- Stromatopteris moniliformis Mett.

Synonyms
- Gleichenia moniliformis (Mettenius) Moore

= Stromatopteris =

Genus of ferns

Stromatopteris is a genus of ferns in the family Gleicheniaceae, endemic to New Caledonia. The only species in the genus is Stromatopteris moniliformis. Its closest relative is the more widespread genus Gleichenia.
