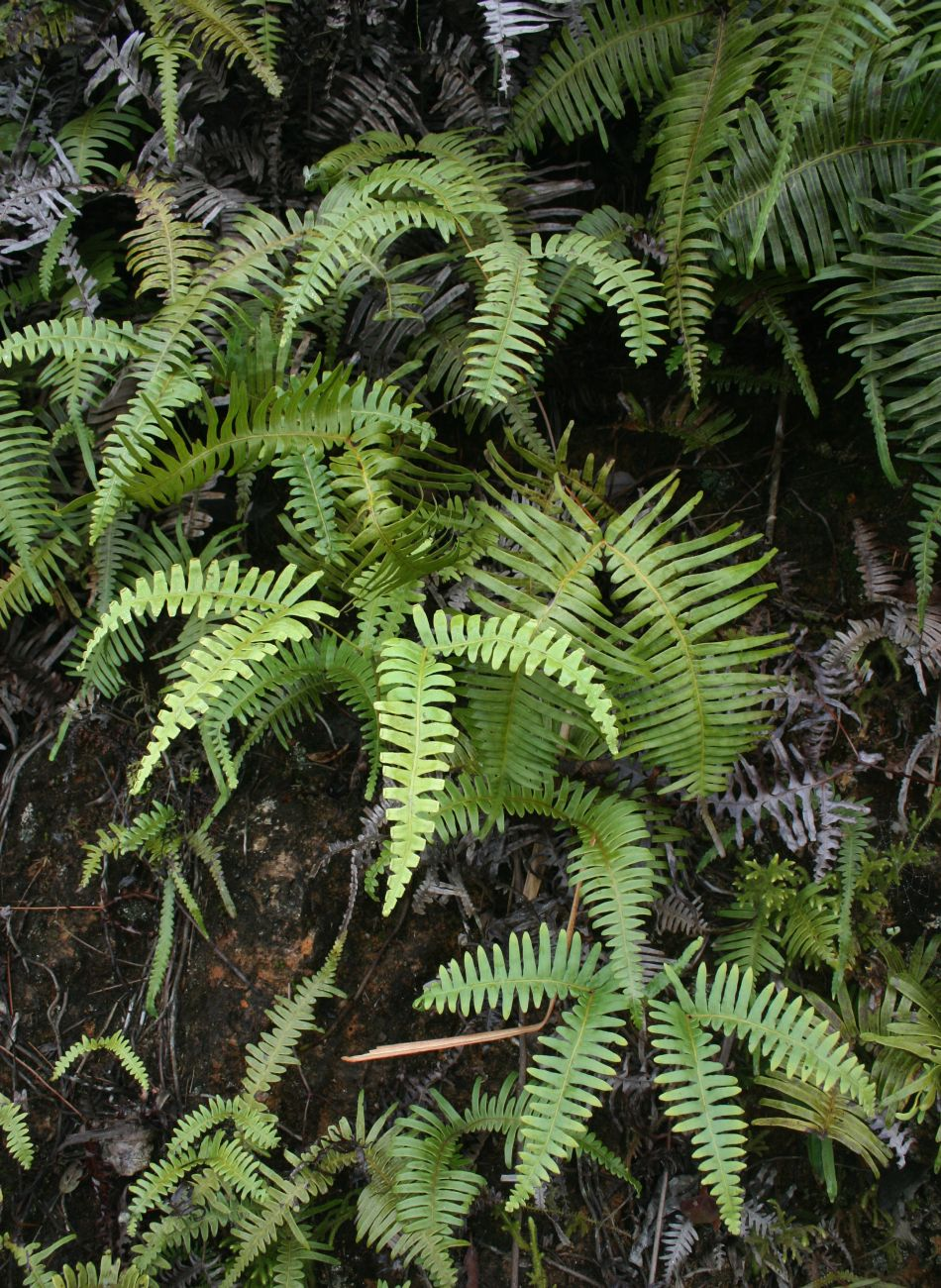
- Dicranopteris linearis

Scientific classification
- Kingdom: Plantae
- Clade: Embryophytes
- Clade: Tracheophytes
- Division: Polypodiophyta
- Class: Polypodiopsida
- Order: Gleicheniales
- Family: Gleicheniaceae
- Genus: Dicranopteris; Bernh.

Type species
- Dicranopteris dichotoma (Thunb. 1784) Bernhardi 1805

Species
- See text

Synonyms
- Hicriopteris Presl 1851 non Copeland; Mertensia Willdenow 1804 non Roth 1797; Mesosorus Hasskarl 1856

= Dicranopteris =

Genus of ferns

Dicranopteris (forkedfern) is a genus of tropical ferns of the family Gleicheniaceae. There are about 20 described species.

== Phylogeny ==
As of March 2023, Plants of the World Online accepted the following species:

Phylogeny of Dicranopteris

- - - - D. flexuosa (Schrad.) Underw. (Drooping forked fern)
      - D. splendida (Hand.-Mazz.) Tagawa
    - - - D. curranii Copel.
        - - D. baliensis Yan & Wei
          - D. weatherbyi (Fosberg) Glassman
      - - D. taiwanensis Ching & Chiu
        - - D. austrosinensis Yan & Wei
          - D. gigantea Ching
  - - section Dicranopteris
      - D. tetraphylla (Rosenstock) Kuo
      - - D. cadetii Tardieu
        - D. pedata (Houtt.) Nakaike
    - section Heteropterygium
      - D. linearis (Burm.f.) Underw.
      - - D. caudata (Copel. 1929) St.John
        - - D. subspeciosa (Holttum) Yan & Wei
          - - D. inaequalis (Rosenst.) Yan & Wei
            - D. subpectinata (Christ) C.M.Kuo

Unassigned species:

- Dicranopteris alternans (Mett.) Yan & Wei
- Dicranopteris clemensiae Holttum
- Dicranopteris dolosa Copel.
- Dicranopteris elegantula Pic.Serm.
- Dicranopteris lanigera (D.Don) Fraser-Jenk.
- Dicranopteris latiloba (Holtt.) Yan & Wei
- Dicranopteris × nepalensis Fraser-Jenk.
- Dicranopteris nervosa (Kaulf.) Ching
- Dicranopteris pubigera (Blume) Nakai
- Dicranopteris rufinervis (Mart.) Ching
- Dicranopteris schomburgkiana (Sturm ex Mart.) C.V.Morton
- Dicranopteris seminuda Maxon
- Dicranopteris seramensis M.Kato
- Dicranopteris speciosa (Presl) Holttum
- Dicranopteris spissa (Fée) Lima & Salino
