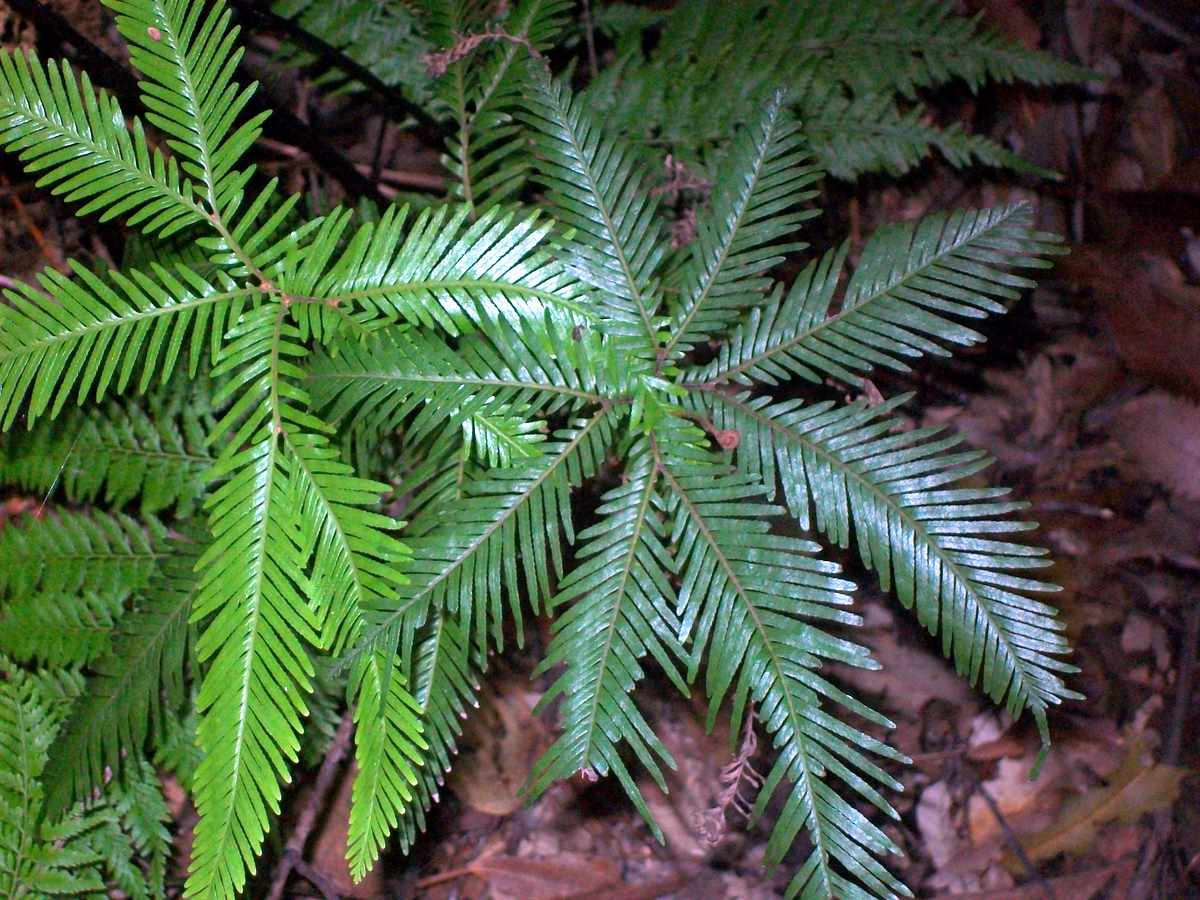
- Sticherus flabellatus at Elvina Bay, Ku-ring-gai Chase National Park, Australia

Scientific classification
- Kingdom: Plantae
- Clade: Tracheophytes
- Division: Polypodiophyta
- Class: Polypodiopsida
- Order: Gleicheniales
- Family: Gleicheniaceae
- Genus: Sticherus; C.Presl

Type species
- Sticherus laevigatus (Willdenow) Presl

Species
- See text

Synonyms
- Sticheropsis Lima, Salino & Almeida 2024

= Sticherus =

Genus of ferns

Sticherus is a genus of about 80–90 species of fern.

In Australia they are commonly referred to as shield ferns. In the United States they are commonly referred to as umbrella ferns.

The fronds are branched at least once with each pair of branches spreading out, forming an umbrella like layer of foliage. Fronds are mostly hairless and often glaucous beneath the frond.

== Phylogeny ==
The following species are recognised as of February 2023.

Phylogeny of Sticherus

- - section Sticherus
    S. truncatus (Willdenow) Nakai 1950
  - section Holopterygium
    - S. tahitensis (Copeland) St. John 1942
    - - - S. cryptocarpus (Hooker) Ching 1940 (Hierba loza, cola de gallo)
        - S. owhyhensis (Hooker) Ching 1940
      - - S. cunninghamii (Heward ex Hooker) Ching 1940 (Waekura)
        - - S. tener (Brown) Ching 1940 (Silky fan fern)
          - - - S. brackenridgei (Fournier) St. John 1942
              - S. flagellaris (Bory ex Willdenow) Ching 1940 (Shiny fan/umbrella fern)
            - - - S. flabellatus (Brown) St. John 1942 (shiny fan fern)
                - S. urceolatus Garrett & Kantvilas 1998
              - - S. bifidus (Willdenow) Ching 1940
                - - S. hypoleucus (Sodiro) Copeland 1947
                  - - S. furcatus (von Linné) Ching 1940
                    - - S. compactus (Christ) Nakai 1950
                      - S. retroflexus (Bornmüller ex Christ) Copeland 1947

Other species include:

- S. albus Gonzales 2011
- S. antillensis Gonzales 2011
- S. arachnoideus Østerg. & Øllgaard 2001
- S. aurantiacus Østerg. & Øllgaard 2001
- S. blepharolepis (Sodiro) Ching 1940
- S. bolanicus (Rosenstock) Copeland 1941
- S. boliviensis (Maxon & Morton) Gonzales 2011
- S. brassii (Christensen) Copeland 1941
- S. brevitomentosus Østerg. & Øllgaard 2001
- S. chocoensis Gonzales 2011
- S. cubensis (Underwood) Gonzales 2011
- S. cundinamarcensis (Hieronymus) Nakai 1950
- S. decurrens (Raddi) Gonzales 2011
- S. erectus (Christensen) Copeland 1941
- S. farinosus (Kaulfuss) Ching 1940
- S. ferrugineus (Desvaux) Gonzales 2011
- S. fulvus (Desvaux) Ching 1940
- S. fuscus Gonzales 2011
- S. gnidioides (Mettenius) Nakai 1950
- S. gracilis (Mart.) Copeland 1947
- S. hastulatus (Rosenstock) Nakai 1950
- S. hirtus (Blume) Ching 1940
- S. hispaniolensis Gonzales
- S. hispidus (Mettenius ex Kuhn) Copeland 1947
- S. holttumii Lima & Salino 2018
- S. hooglandii (Holttum) Perrie 2018
- S. impressus (Parris) Parris 1992
- S. inflexus Pichi Sermolli 1972
- S. interjectus (Jermy & Walker) Gonzales 2011
- S. intermedius (Baker) Chrysler 1944
- S. jacha Gonzales 2011
- S. jamaicensis (Underwood) Nakai 1950
- S. lanosus (Christ) Gonzales 2011
- S. lanuginosus (Fée) Nakai 1950
- S. lechleri (Mettenius ex Kuhn) Nakai 1950
- S. ×leonis (Maxon) Gonzales 2011
- S. lepidotus (R.A.Rodr.) R.A.Rodr. & Ponce 2007
- S. litoralis (Phil.) Nakai 1950
- S. lobatus Wakef. 1943 (spreading fan fern)
- S. loheri (Christ) Copeland 1947
- S. longipinnatus (Hooker) Ching 1940
- S. maritimus (Hieronymus) Nakai 1950
- S. melanoblastus (Alston) Østerg. & Øllgaard 2001
- S. milnei (Baker) Ching 1940
- S. montaguei (Compton) Nakai 1950
- S. moyobambensis Gonzales 2011
- S. nervatus Gonzales 2011
- S. nigropaleaceus (Sturm) Prado & Lellinger 1996
- S. nudus (Moritz ex Reichardt) Nakai 1950
- S. oceanicus (Kuhn) Ching 1940
- S. orthocladus (Christ) Chrysler 1944
- S. ovatus Gonzales 2011
- S. pallescens (Mettenius) Vareschi 1969
- S. penniger (Mart.) Copeland 1947
- S. peruvianus (Maxon) Smith, Kessler & Gonzales 1999
- S. pruinosus (Mart.) Ching 1940
- S. ×pseudobifidus (Jermy & Walker) Gonzales 2011
- S. pseudoscandens (van Alderwerelt van Rosenburgh) Copeland 1941
- S. pteridellus (Christ) Copeland 1947
- S. pulcher Copeland 1941
- S. quadripartitus (Poiret) Ching 1940
- S. reflexipinnulus (Christensen) Copeland 1941
- S. remotus (Kaulfuss) Chrysler 1944
- S. revolutus (Kunth) Ching 1940
- S. rubiginosus (Mettenius) Nakai 1950
- S. rufus Gonzales 2011
- S. salinoi Lima 2018
- S. simplex (Desvaux) Ching 1940
- S. squamosus (Fée) Gonzales 2011
- S. squamulosus (Desvaux) Nakai 1950
- S. strictissimus (Christ) Copeland 1947
- S. ×subremotus (Jermy & Walker) Gonzales 2011
- S. tepuiensis Smith 1990
- S. tomentosus (Cavanilles ex Swartz) Smith 1990
- S. umbraculifer (Kunze) Ching 1940
- S. underwoodianus (Maxon) Nakai 1950
- S. velatus (Kunze) Copeland 1947
- S. venosus Copeland 1941
- S. vestitus (Blume) Ching 1940
