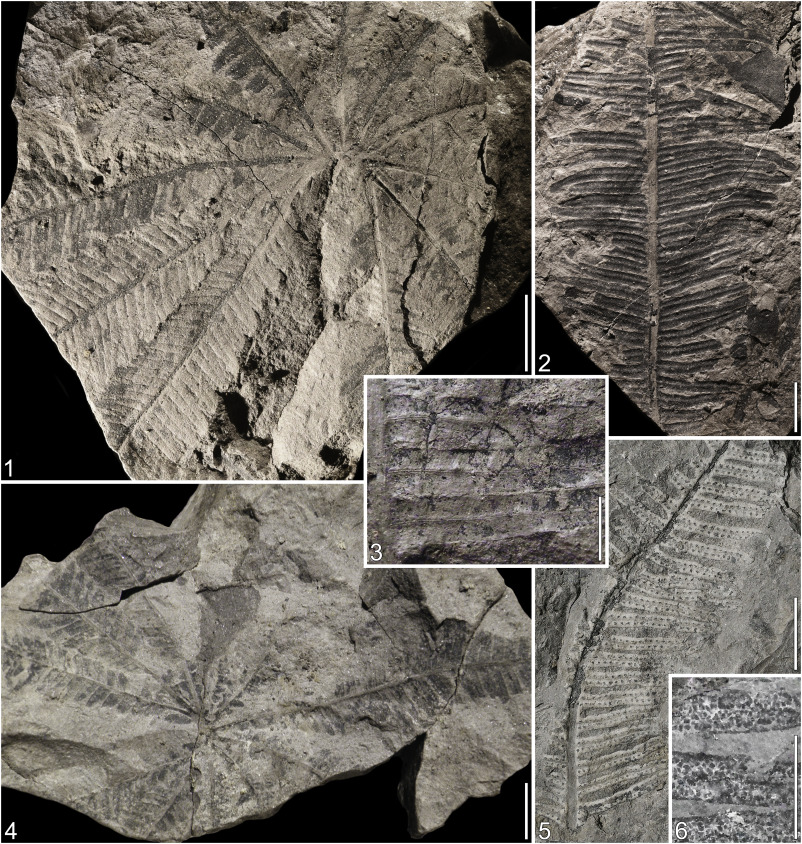
- Fossils of Phlebopteris muensteri from the latest Triassic of Germany

Scientific classification
- Kingdom: Plantae
- Clade: Tracheophytes
- Division: Polypodiophyta
- Class: Polypodiopsida
- Order: Gleicheniales
- Family: Matoniaceae
- Genus: †Phlebopteris; Brongniart 1836

Species
- Phlebopteris dunkeri (Schenk) Schenk 1875.; Phlebopteris fiemmensis Kustatscher et al, 2014; Phlebopteris polypodioides (type) Brongniart 1836; Phlebopteris woodwardii Leckenby 1864

= Phlebopteris =

Phlebopteris Temporal range: Ladinian–Early Cretaceous

Extinct genus of ferns

Phlebopteris is an extinct genus of Mesozoic fern belonging to the family Matoniaceae.

== Description and morphology ==
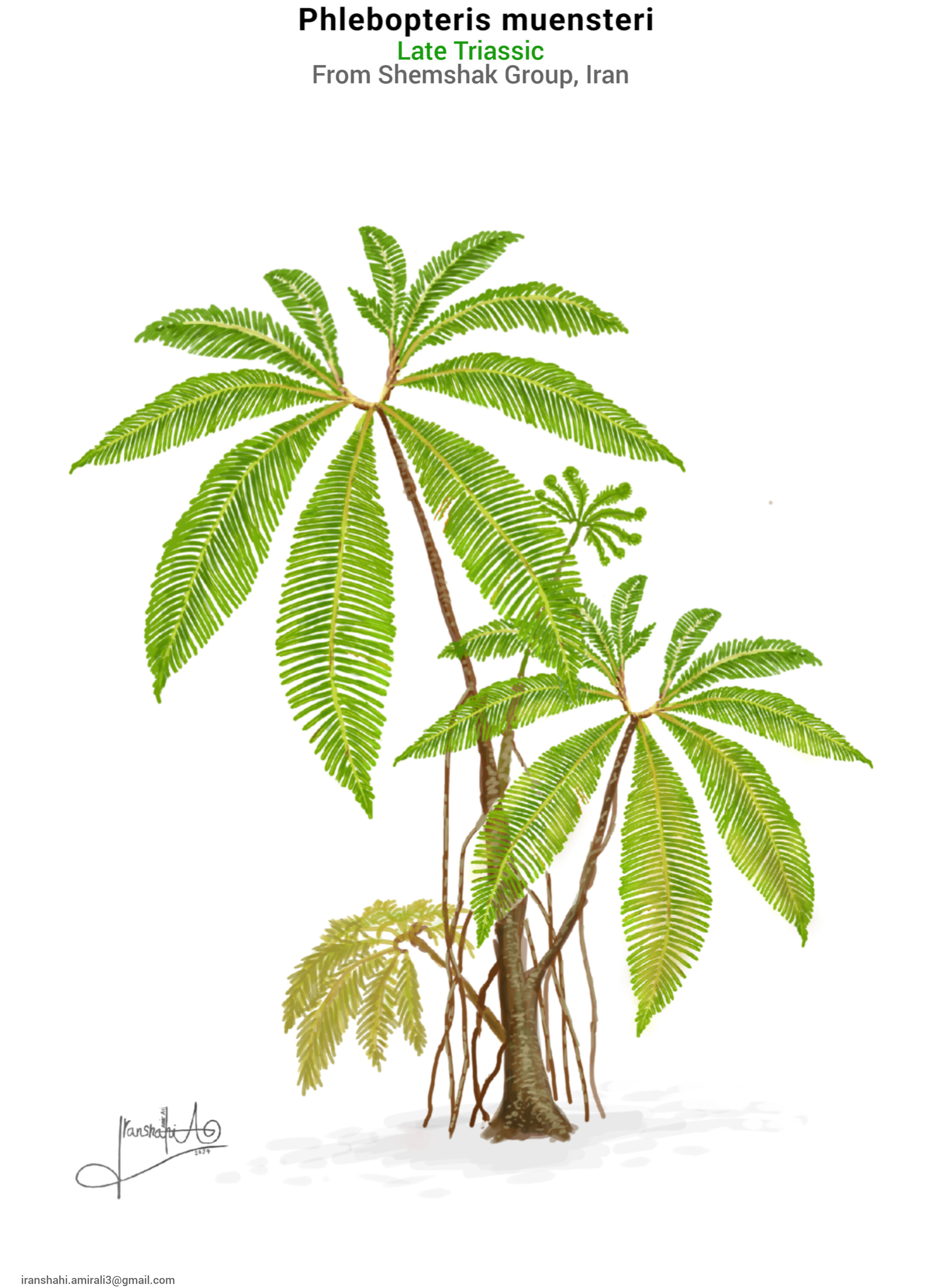
Life restoration of Phlebopteris muensteri structure of stem speculative

it is diagnosed by "pinna exhibiting short or long pinnules with decurrent or non-decurrent base; midrib often reaching the apex; secondary veins dichotomously branched, with or without forming a reticulate venation; circular sori lacking indusium; sori with five to six annulate sporangia annulus; trilete, subtriangular, tetrahedral or round spores." Phlebopteris angustiloba and Phlebopteris muensteri are suggested to have grown as herbaceous plants rather than as tree ferns.

The oldest fossil of the genus is known from the Ladinian of Italy. The genus was almost globally distributed during the Jurassic, with a concentration of species in the northern hemisphere. Species like Phlebopteris polypodioides, P. tracyi, and P. angustiloba are suggested to have grown in humid habitats as understory vegetation, with Phlebopteris woodwardii suggested to have grown along riverbanks, as well as in heaths and peat swamps.

== See also ==
- Pteridophyte
- Paleobotany
- Fossil fern
