= Sticheropsis =

Scientific classification
- Kingdom: Plantae
- Clade: Tracheophytes
- Division: Polypodiophyta
- Class: Polypodiopsida
- Order: Gleicheniales
- Family: Gleicheniaceae
- Genus: Sticheropsis; L.V.Lima, Salino & T.E.Almeida

Genus of ferns

Sticheropsis is a genus of ferns in the family Gleicheniaceae. It includes two species which range from southern China (southeastern Yunnan) through Indochina, Malesia, and Papuasia to Queensland and the southwestern Pacific.

- Sticheropsis milnei (Baker) L.V.Lima, Salino & T.E.Almeida – Sulawesi, Maluku, Papuasia, Queensland, New Caledonia, Santa Cruz Islands, and Vanuatu
- Sticheropsis truncata (Willd.) L.V.Lima, Salino & T.E.Almeida – southern China (southeastern Yunnan and Hainan), Indochina, and Malesia
