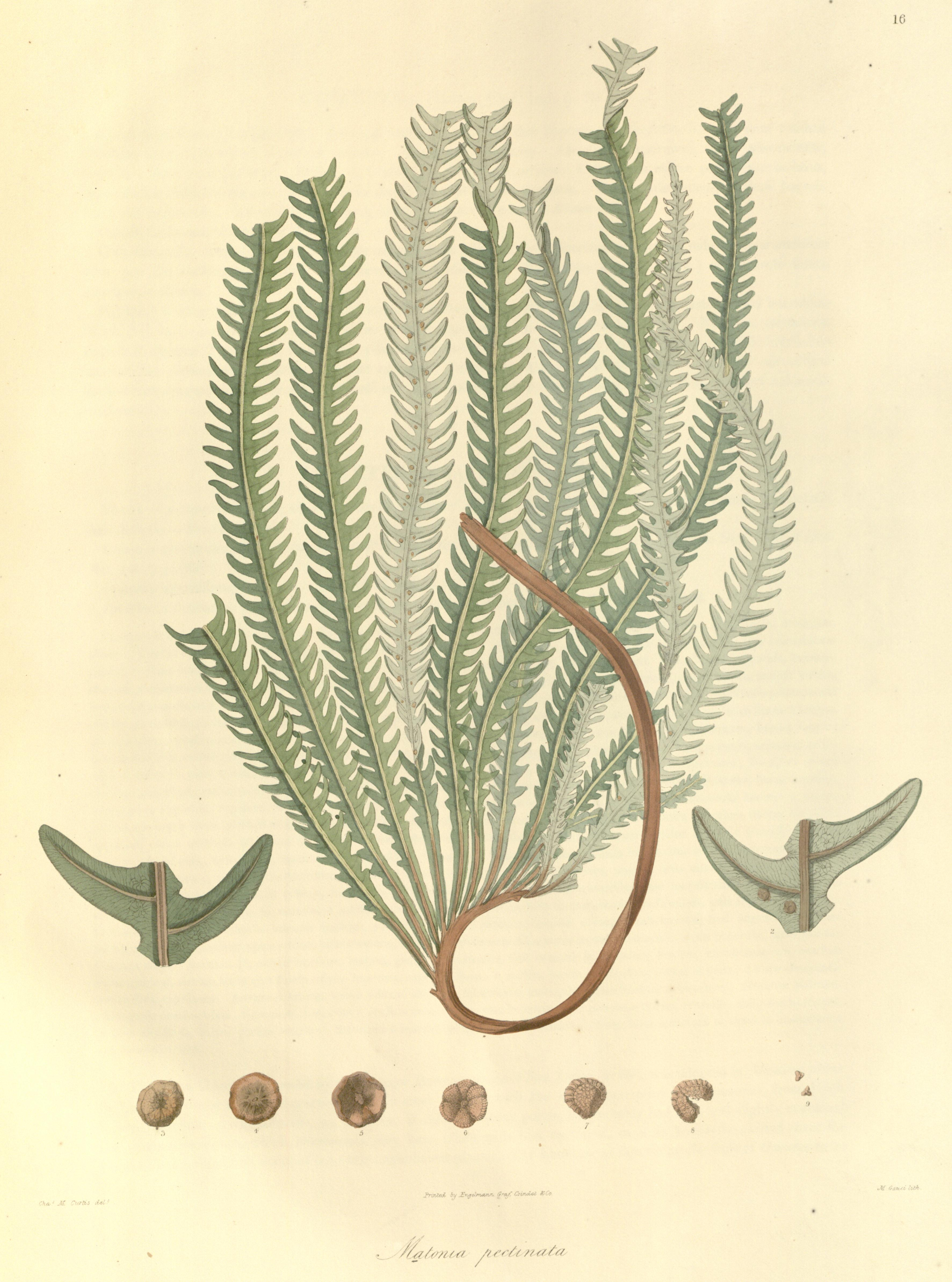

Scientific classification
- Kingdom: Plantae
- Clade: Tracheophytes
- Division: Polypodiophyta
- Class: Polypodiopsida
- Order: Gleicheniales
- Family: Matoniaceae
- Genus: Matonia
- Species: M. pectinata

Binomial name
- Matonia pectinata R.Br. 1829

Synonyms
- Prionopteris farquhariana

= Matonia pectinata =

Species of fern

Matonia pectinata is a species of herbaceous fern in the family Matoniaceae. It was first described by Scottish botanist Robert Brown in 1829.

It is native from peninsular Thailand southward to Sumatra. It is most noteworthy for its pedate fronds with as many as twenty-six primary pinnae, each with about 120 pinnate leaflets.
