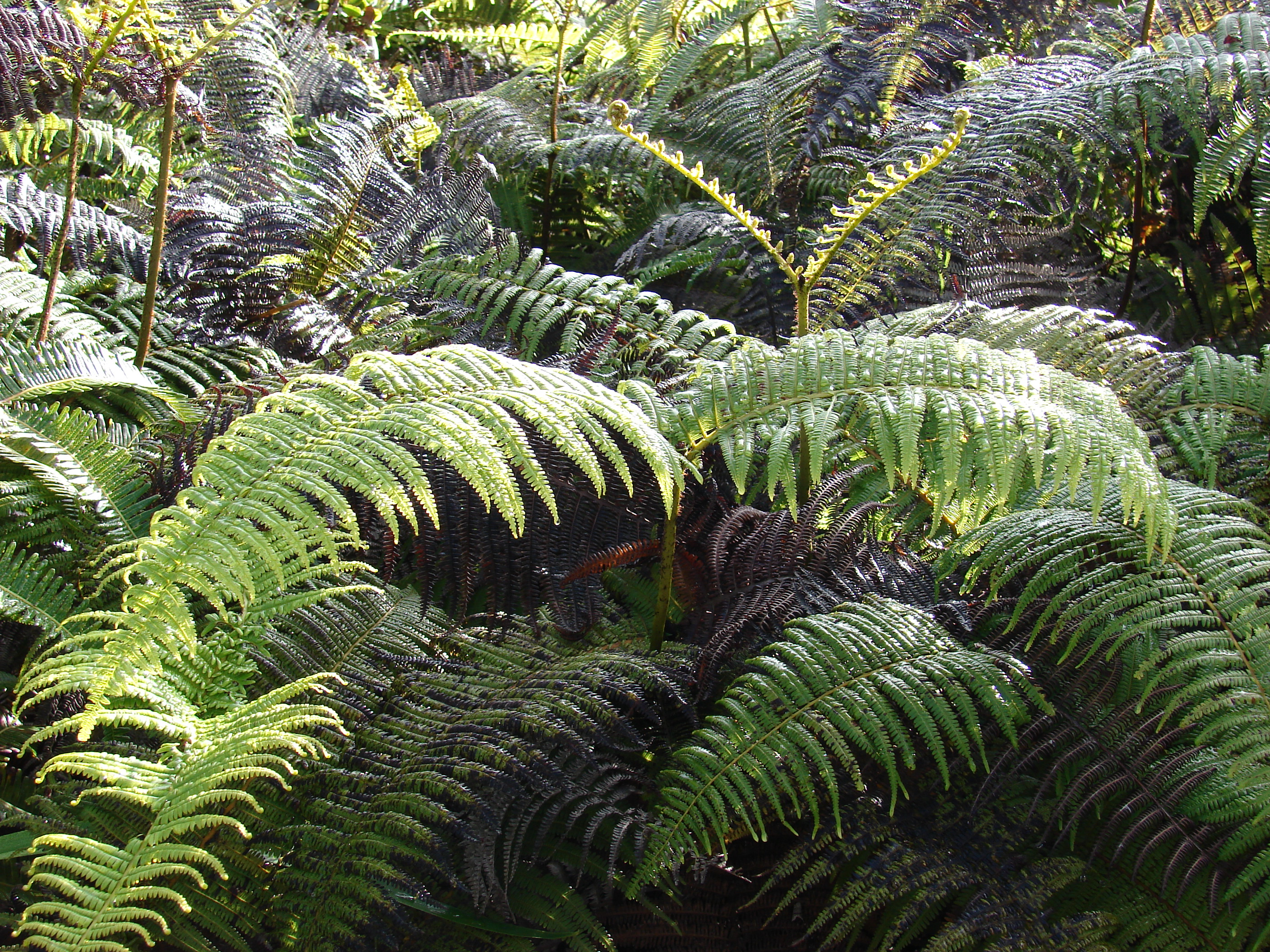
- Diplopterygium pinnatum in Hawaii

Scientific classification
- Kingdom: Plantae
- Clade: Tracheophytes
- Division: Polypodiophyta
- Class: Polypodiopsida
- Order: Gleicheniales
- Family: Gleicheniaceae
- Genus: Diplopterygium (Diels) Nakai

Type species
- Diplopterygium glaucum (Thunb. ex Houtt.) Nakai

Species
- See text.

= Diplopterygium =

Genus of ferns

Diplopterygium is a genus of ferns in the family Gleicheniaceae.

== Phylogeny ==
As of November 2019, Plants of the World Online recognized the following species:

Phylogeny of Diplopterygium

- - - D. bancroftii (Hook.) A.R.Sm.
    - D. laevissimum (Christ) Nakai
  - - D. chinense (Rosenst.) De Vol
    - - - D. cantonense (Ching) Nakai
        - - D. glaucum (Thunb. ex Houtt.) Nakai
          - D. longissimum (Blume) Nakai
      - - D. blotianum (C.Chr.) Nakai
        - - - D. giganteum (Wall. ex Hook.) Nakai
            - D. glaucoides (Ching) Ching ex Wang
          - - D. pinnatum (Kunze) Nakai
            - D. rufum (Ching) Ching ex X.C.Zhang

Unassigned species:

- Diplopterygium angustilobum (Holttum) Parris
- Diplopterygium brevipinnulum (Holttum) Parris
- Diplopterygium bullatum (T.Moore) Parris
- Diplopterygium clemensiae (Copel.) Parris
- Diplopterygium conversum (Alderw.) Nakai
- Diplopterygium deflexum (Holttum) Parris
- Diplopterygium elmeri (Copel.) Nakai
- Diplopterygium irregulare W.M.Chu & Z.R.He
- Diplopterygium norrisii (Mett.) Nakai
- Diplopterygium sordidum (Copel.) Parris
- Diplopterygium volubile (Jungh.) Nakai
