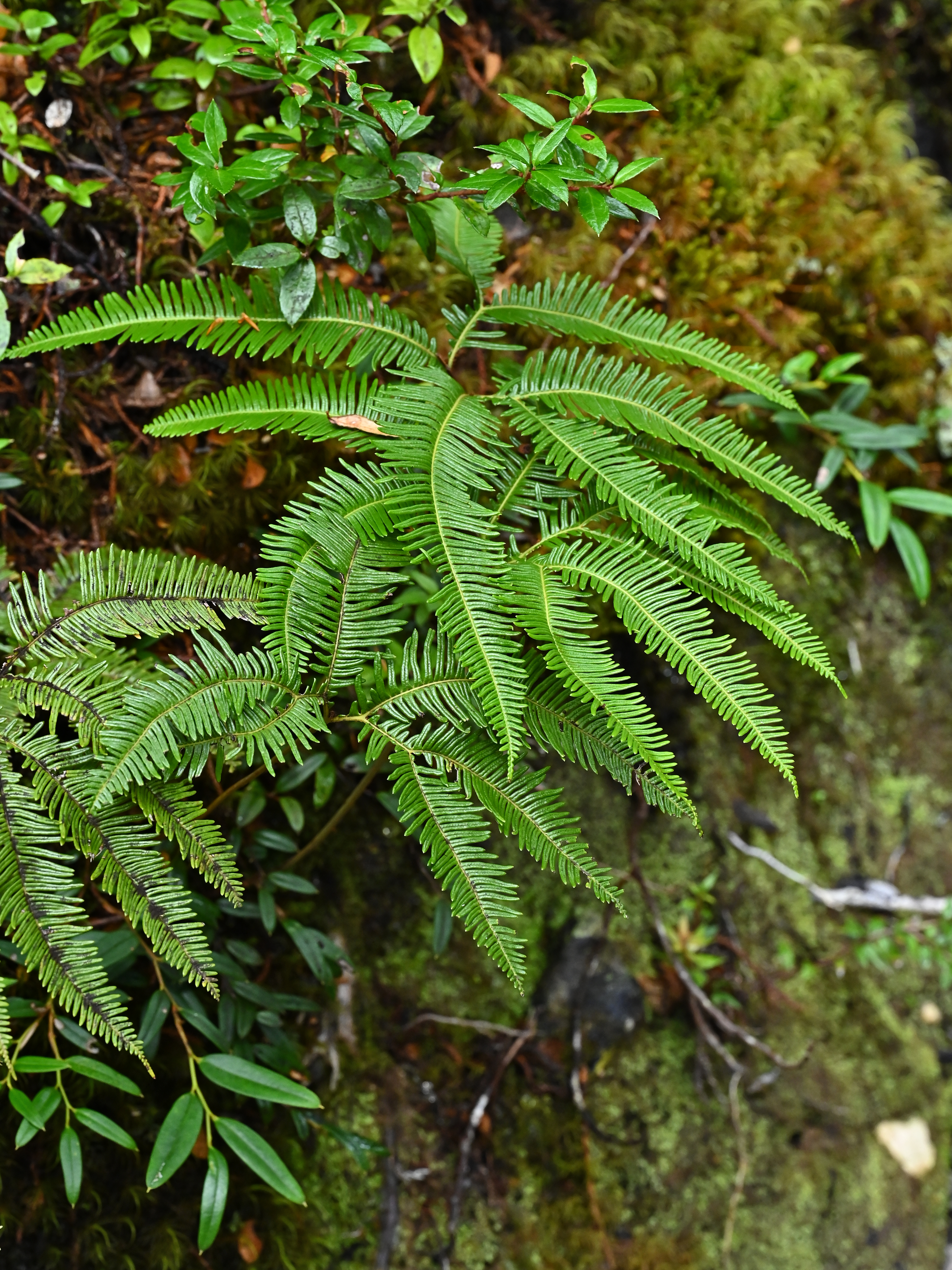

Scientific classification
- Kingdom: Plantae
- Clade: Tracheophytes
- Division: Polypodiophyta
- Class: Polypodiopsida
- Order: Gleicheniales
- Family: Gleicheniaceae
- Genus: Sticherus
- Species: S. quadripartitus

Binomial name
- Sticherus quadripartitus (Poir.) Ching

= Sticherus quadripartitus =

Species of fern

Sticherus quadripartitus is a species of fern native to Chile with a natural distribution ranging from the latitude of Concepción (~37° S) in the north to Magallanes Region (~55° S) in the south including adjacent parts of Argentina. It is also found in the Juan Fernández Islands. It grows found from sea level up to 1800 m.a.s.l. and occurs in humid areas that are neither shady or too exposed to direct sunlight.
