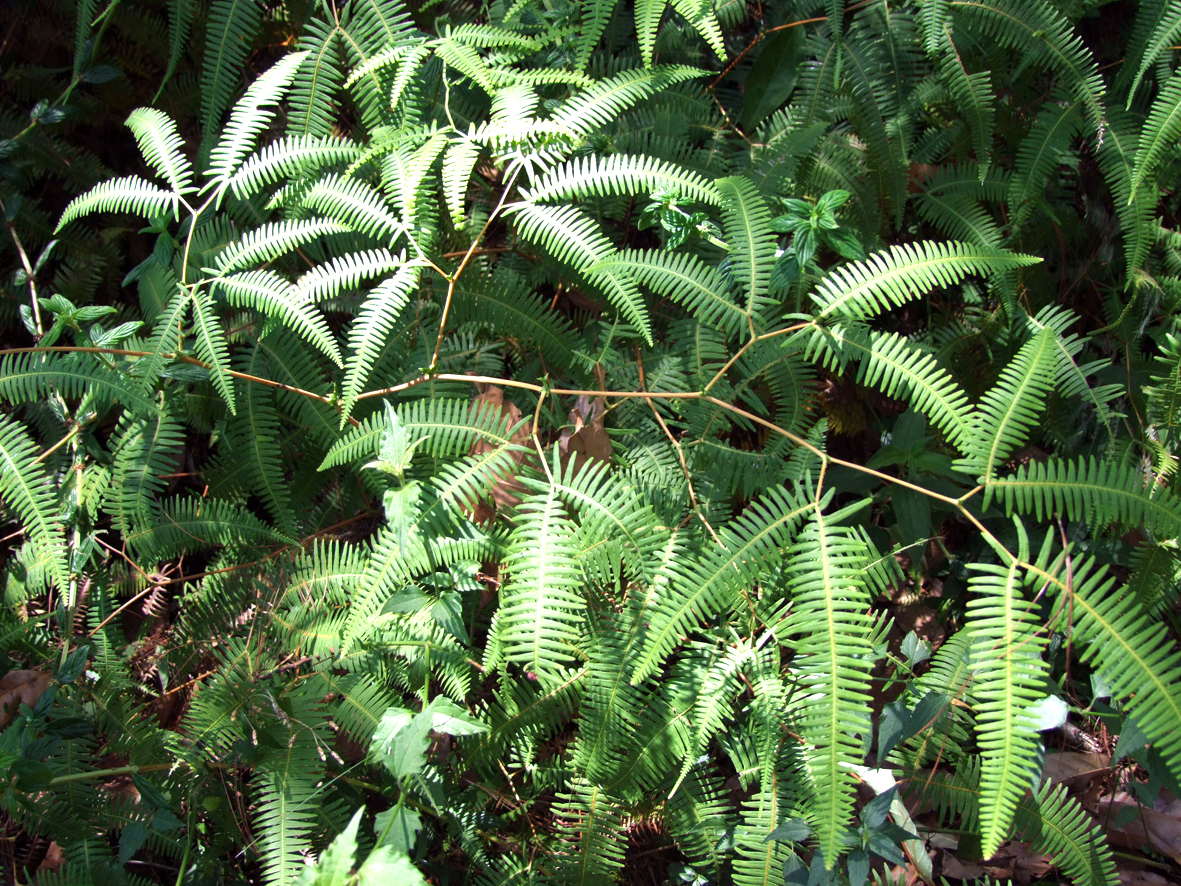

Scientific classification
- Kingdom: Plantae
- Clade: Embryophytes
- Clade: Tracheophytes
- Division: Polypodiophyta
- Class: Polypodiopsida
- Order: Gleicheniales
- Family: Gleicheniaceae
- Genus: Gleichenella; Ching
- Species: G. pectinata

Binomial name
- Gleichenella pectinata (Willd.) Ching

Synonyms
- Gleichenia section Acropterygium Diels; Acropterygium (Diels) Nakai, non Acropterygia Schaeffer; Acropterygium pectinatum (Willdenow) Nakai; Mertensia pectinata Willdenow

= Gleichenella =

Genus of ferns

Gleichenella is a genus of ferns in the family Gleicheniaceae with a single described species, Gleichenella pectinata from the Americas.
