= Rouxopteris =

Scientific classification
- Kingdom: Plantae
- Clade: Tracheophytes
- Division: Polypodiophyta
- Class: Polypodiopsida
- Order: Gleicheniales
- Family: Gleicheniaceae
- Genus: Rouxopteris; Hong M.Liu

Genus of plants

Rouxopteris is a genus of ferns in the family Gleicheniaceae. It includes three species native to eastern tropical Africa (Kenya, Malawi, Rwanda, Tanzania, and Uganda) and to the islands of Madagascar and Réunion in the western Indian Ocean.

- Rouxopteris boryi (Kunze) Hong M.Liu – Réunion
- Rouxopteris elongata (Baker) L.V.Lima, Salino & T.E.Almeida – Kenya, Malawi, Rwanda, Tanzania, and Uganda
- Rouxopteris madagascariensis (C.Chr.) L.V.Lima, Salino & T.E.Almeida – Madagascar and Réunion
