= Gleichenia cryptocarpa =

Scientific classification
- Kingdom: Plantae
- Clade: Tracheophytes
- Division: Polypodiophyta
- Class: Polypodiopsida
- Order: Gleicheniales
- Family: Gleicheniaceae
- Genus: Gleichenia
- Species: G. cryptocarpa

Binomial name
- Gleichenia cryptocarpa Hook.

Species of fern

Gleichenia cryptocarpa known locally as yerba loza, cola de gallo and ampe, is a fern with a natural distribution in Chile ranging from Maule Region (~35° S) in the north to Aysén Region (~47° S) in the south including adjacent areas of Argentina. It grows also naturally in the Falkland Islands. It is found in altitude ranging from 20 to 2240 m.a.s.l.
