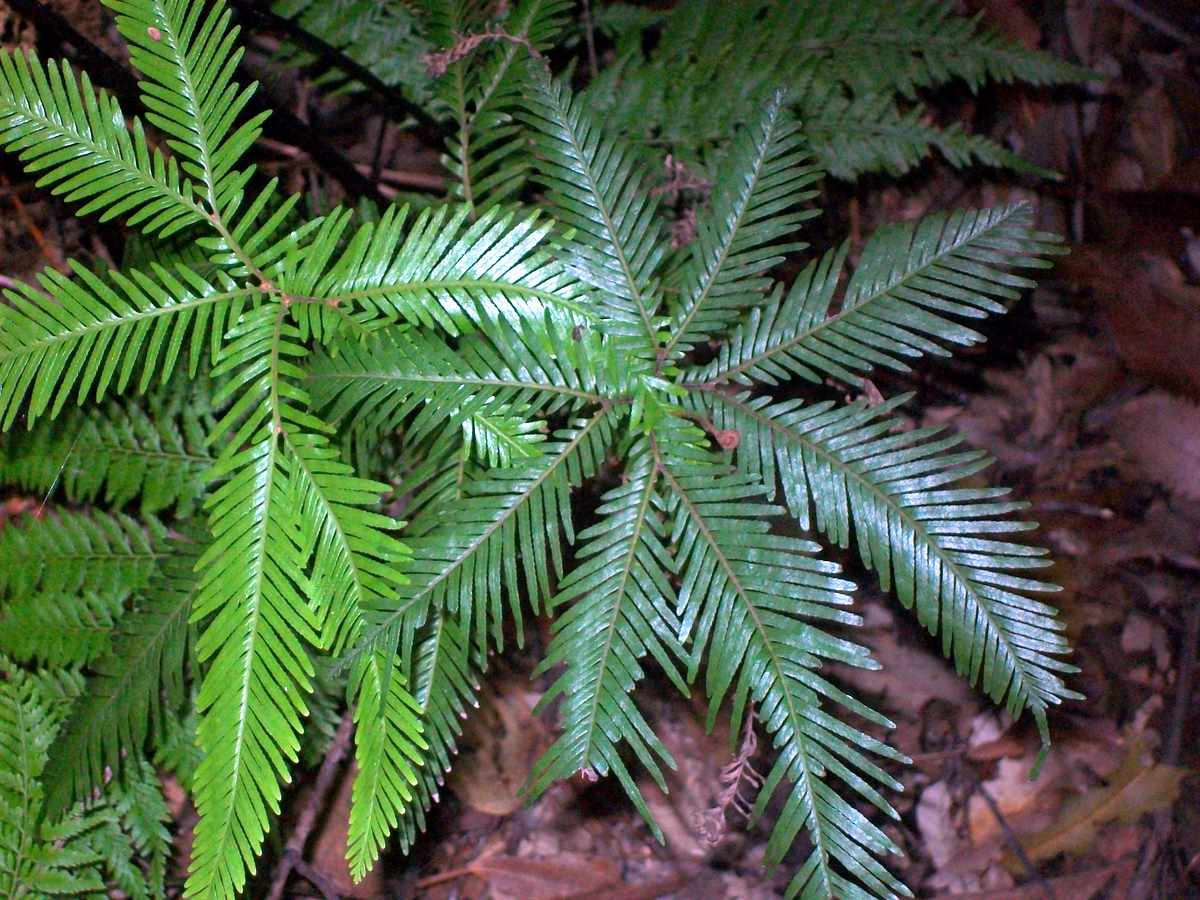
- Shiny fan fern at Elvina Bay, Ku-ring-gai Chase National Park, Australia

Scientific classification
- Kingdom: Plantae
- Clade: Tracheophytes
- Division: Polypodiophyta
- Class: Polypodiopsida
- Order: Gleicheniales
- Family: Gleicheniaceae
- Genus: Sticherus
- Species: S. flabellatus

Binomial name
- Sticherus flabellatus (R.Br.) H.St.John

Synonyms
- Gleichenia flabellata R.Br.; Mertensia flabellata (R.Br.) Poir.

= Sticherus flabellatus =

Species of fern

Sticherus flabellatus, the shiny fan fern, or umbrella fern, is a small fern found in eastern Australia and in New Zealand, northwards from the north-west of the South Island. It is a common and attractive plant with shiny dark foliage and with slightly toothed edges on the smallest parts of the fronds, often seen in large numbers in suitably moist gullies and by creeks.

Two varieties are recognized that differ in size of the sporangia and the size of the ultimate segments. The variety in New South Wales is Sticherus flabellatus var. flabellatus.

In 1810 it appeared as Gleichenia flabellata in Prodromus Florae Novae Hollandiae, authored by Robert Brown.
