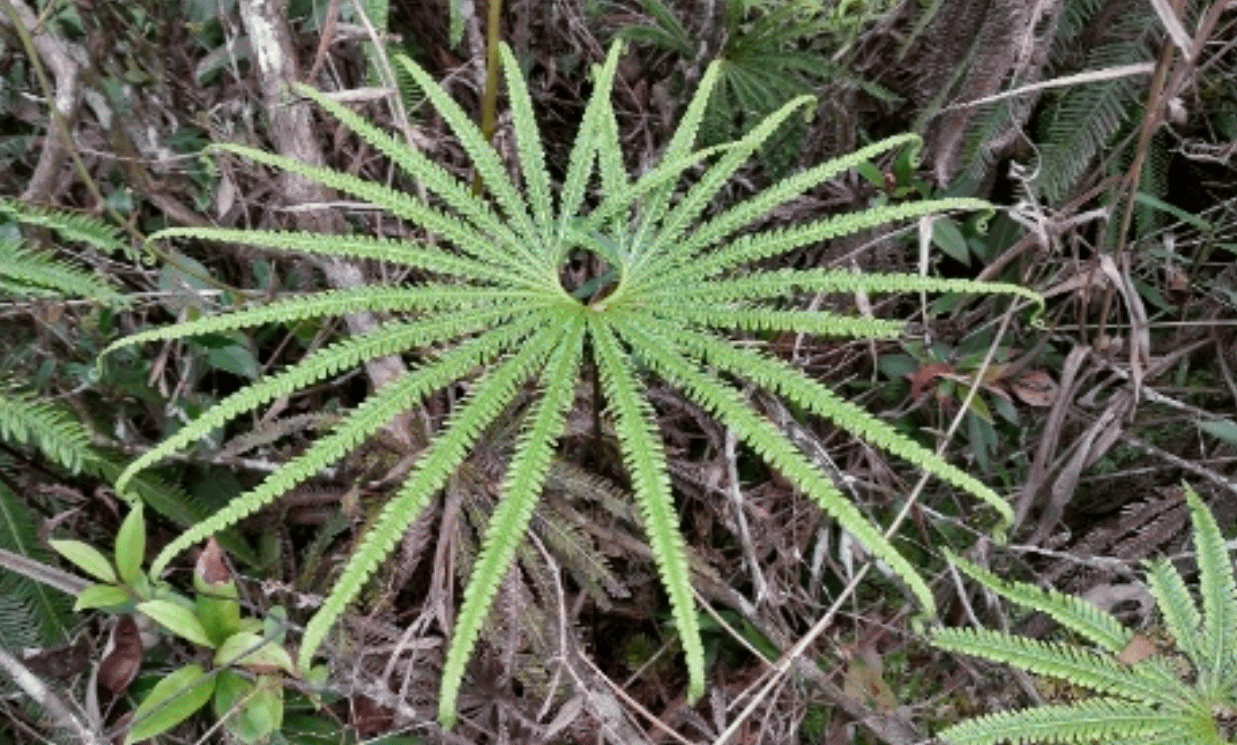
- Matonia pectinata

Scientific classification
- Kingdom: Plantae
- Clade: Tracheophytes
- Division: Polypodiophyta
- Class: Polypodiopsida
- Order: Gleicheniales
- Family: Matoniaceae; C.Presl 1847

Genera
- Matonia R.Br. ex Wall. 1829; Phanerosorus Copel. 1909

= Matoniaceae =

Matoniaceae Temporal range: Middle Triassic–Recent

Family of ferns

Matoniaceae is one of the three families of ferns in the Gleicheniales order of the Polypodiopsida class. Fossil records reveal that Matoniaceae ferns were abundant during the Mesozoic era (about 250-million to 66-million years ago), during which they lived on every continent, including Antarctica, with eight genera and 26 species, with the oldest known specimens being from the Middle Triassic of Antarctica. Today the family is much less abundant, and also less diverse, with only two extant genera and four species, which are limited to portions of southeastern Asia.

The following diagram shows a likely phylogenic relationship with the other two families of the Gleicheniales.

- Gleicheniales
  - - Gleicheniaceae
      6 extant genera
  - - Dipteridaceae
      2 extant genera
    - Matoniaceae
      - Matonia
      - Phanerosorus

== Extant taxa ==
- genus Matonia R.Br. ex Wall. 1829
  - species Matonia pectinata R. Br. 1829
  - species Matonia sarmentosa Baker 1887
- genus Phanerosorus Copel. 1909
  - species Phanerosorus sarmentosus (Baker) Copel. 1909
  - species Phanerosorus major Diels 1932

== Extinct genera ==
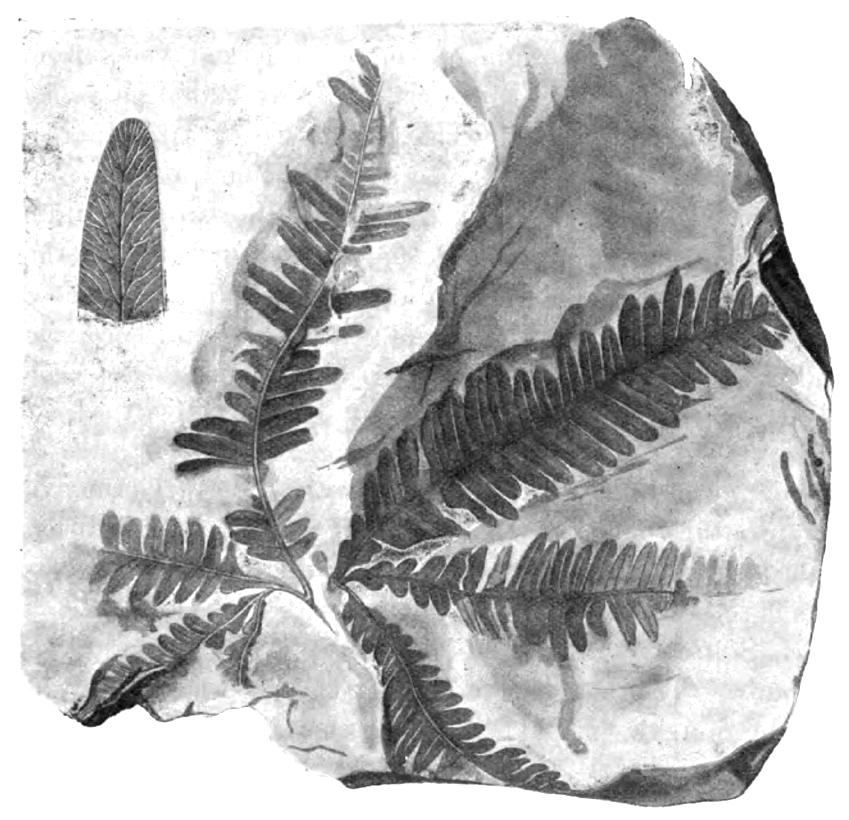
Laccopteris elegans

Some common Mesozoic Matoniaceae genera and a sampling of their species include:

- genus Laccopteris Presl 1838
  - species Laccopteris elegans Presl 1838
  - species Laccopteris münsteri Schenk 1867
- genus Phlebopteris Brongniart 1828
  - species Phlebopteris polypodioides Brongniart
  - species Phlebopteris smithii
  - species Phlebopteris woodwardii Leckenby 1864
  - species Phlebopteris utensis
  - species Phlebopteris angustiloba
- genus Matonidium
- genus Matonia R.Br. ex Wall. 1829
  - species Matonia jeffersonii
  - species Matonia pectinata
  - species Matonia braunii
  - species Matonia mesozoica
  - species Matonia brownii
- genus Microdictyon
- genus Weichselia Stiehler
- Tomaniopteris Klavins et al. Fremouw Formation, Middle Triassic, Antarctica
- Konijnenburgia Kvaček et Dašková, 2010 Piedra Clavada Formation, Argentina, Albian
