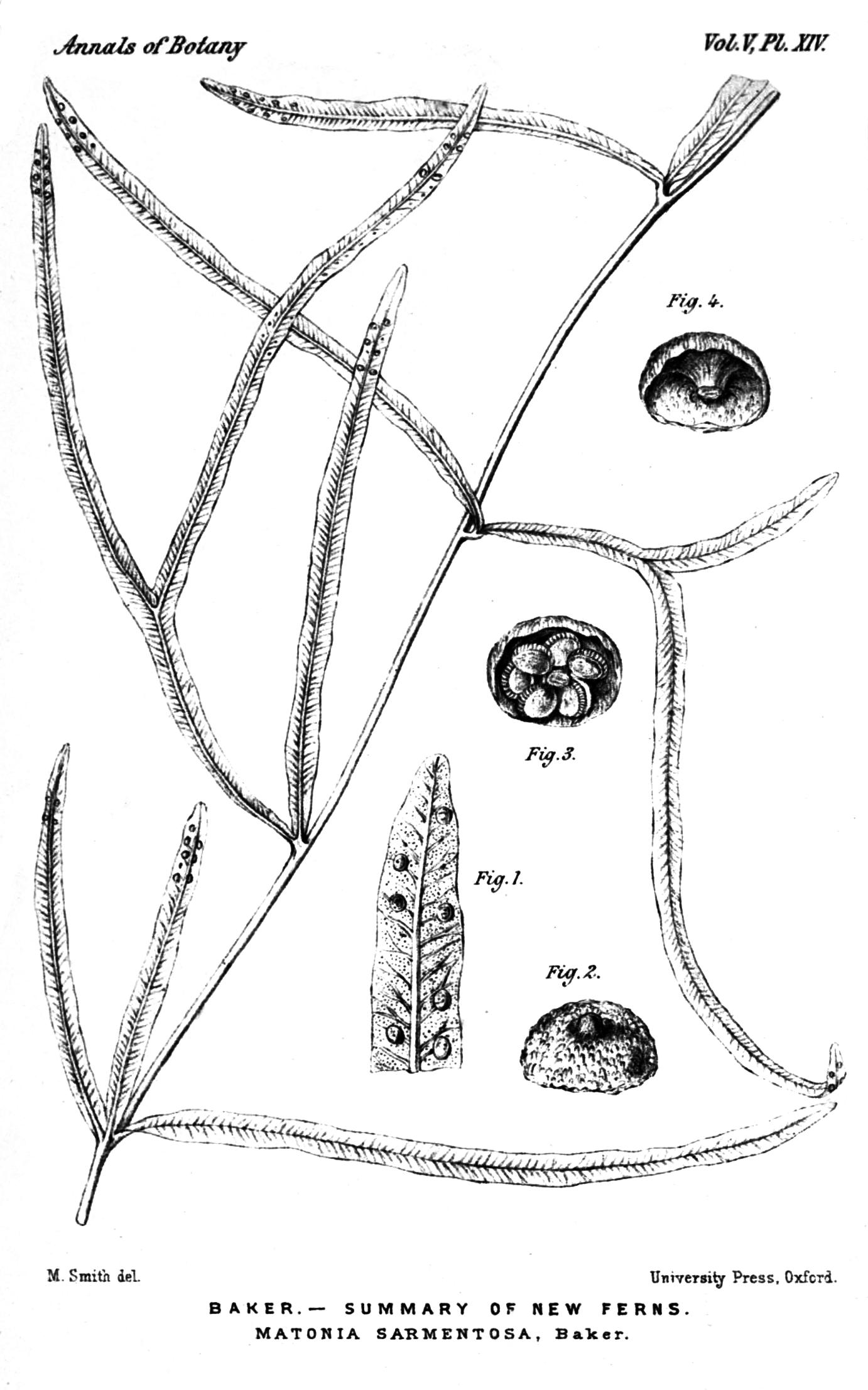
- An 1891 botanical illustration of Phanerosorus sarmentosus (as Matonia sarmentosa)

Scientific classification
- Kingdom: Plantae
- Clade: Tracheophytes
- Division: Polypodiophyta
- Class: Polypodiopsida
- Order: Gleicheniales
- Family: Matoniaceae
- Genus: Phanerosorus; Copel.

Type species
- Phanerosorus sarmentosus (Baker) Copel.

Species
- See text.

= Phanerosorus =

Genus of ferns

Phanerosorus is a genus of ferns in the family Matoniaceae.

== Species ==
As of October 2019, Plants of the World Online and the Checklist of Ferns and Lycophytes of the World accept the following species:

- Phanerosorus major Diels
- Phanerosorus sarmentosus (Baker) Copel.
