= Ampe (game) =

Game played by school-age children

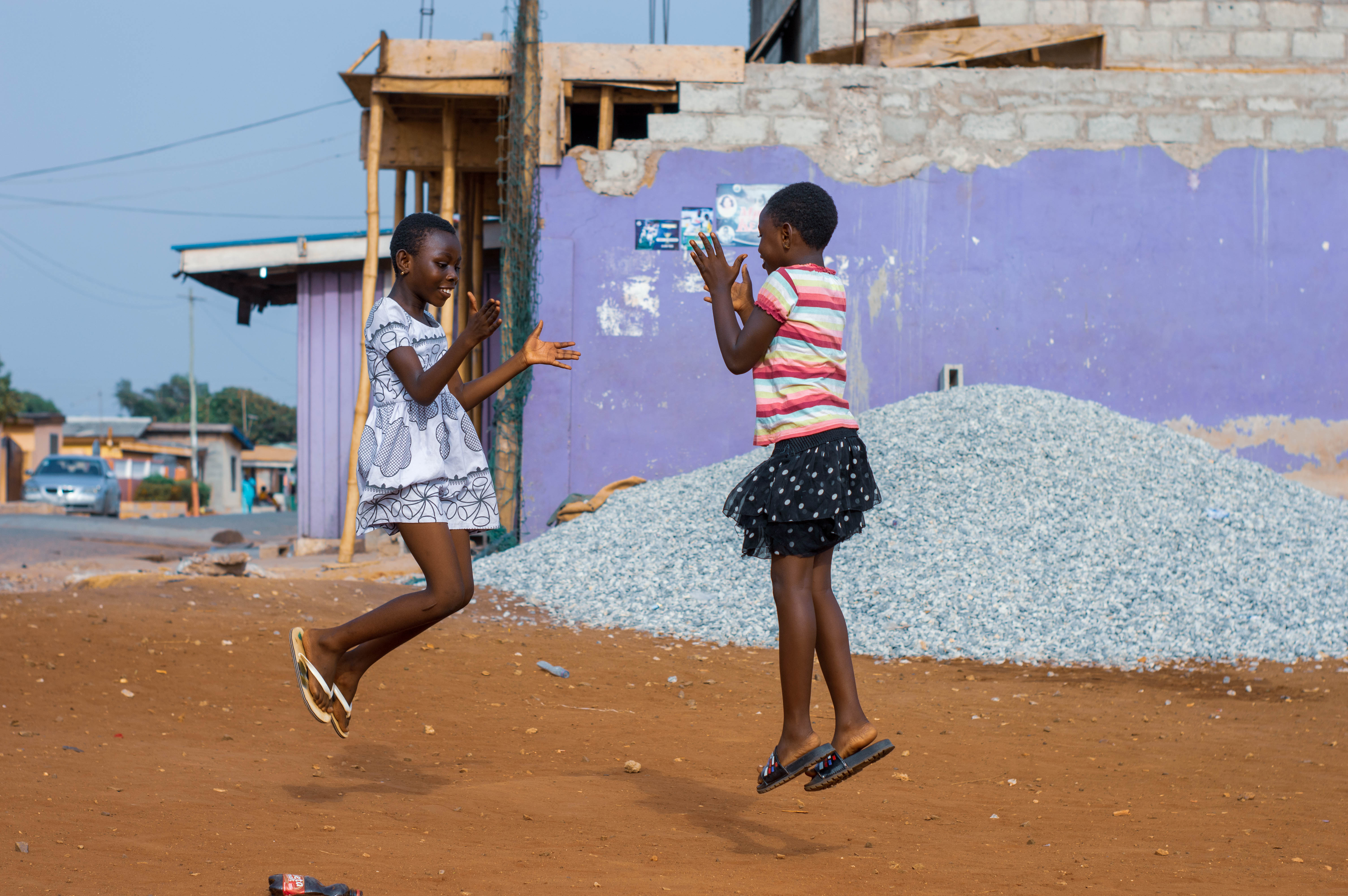
Two girls playing Ampe

Ampe is a simple but energy-driven game played by school-age children. It originated from Ghana and also played in other neighbouring countries. It is played by two or more people and requires no equipment.

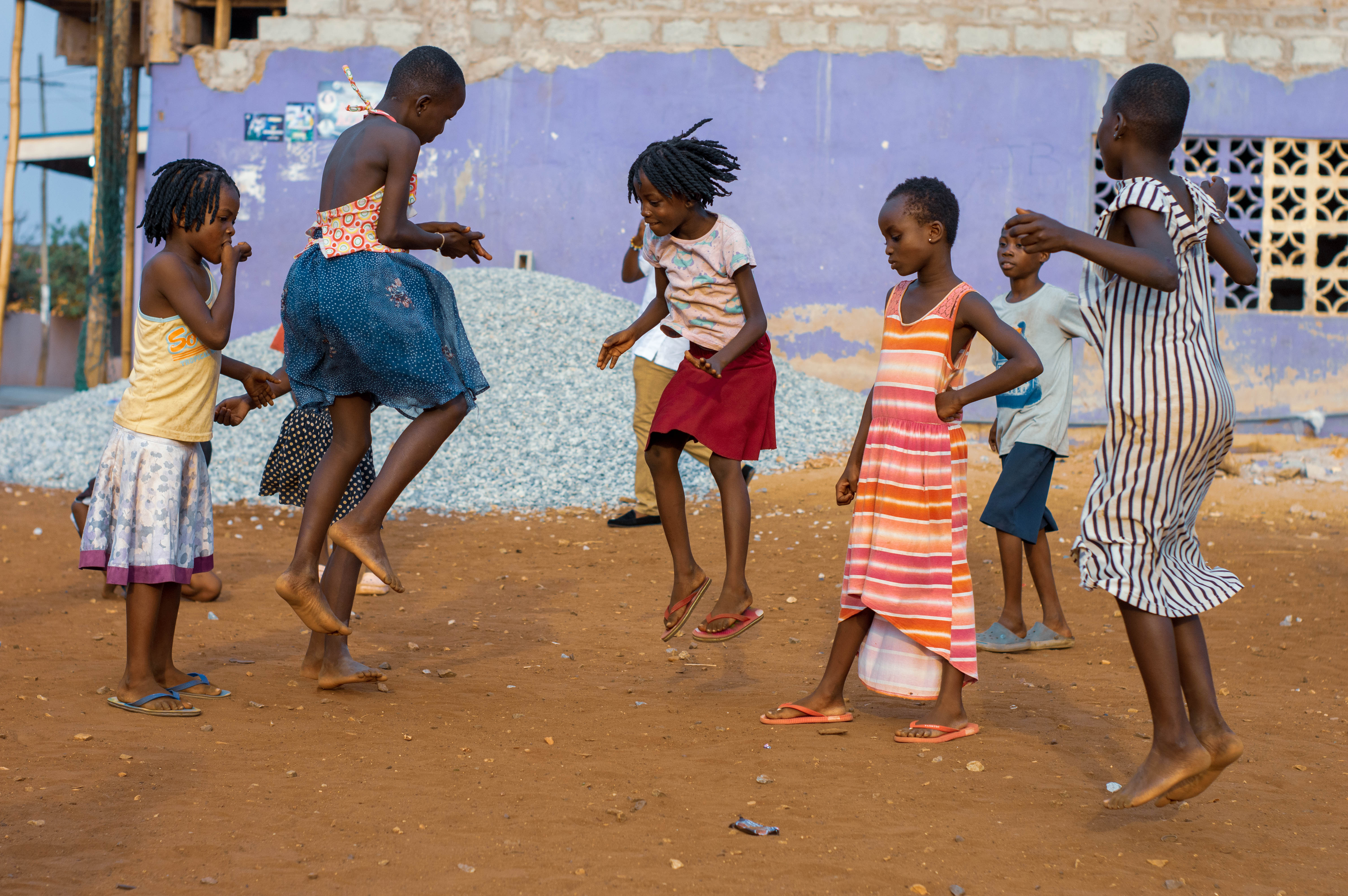
More girls playing Ampe

== Gameplay ==
The game involves a leader and another player jump up at the same time, clap, and thrust one foot forward when they jump up. If the leader and the other player have the same foot forward, the leader wins a point. If they are different, then the other player becomes "it" and plays against the remaining players. If the players are in a circle, the leader moves inside the circle, playing against others in turn. If they are in a line, the leader moves on down the line. If only two players are playing, they keep score until a certain number of points determines a winner.

== International Tournament ==
Cultural Games Association of Ghana, a local sports organization working in collaboration and partnership with the National Sports Authority and the National Commission on Culture respectively, organized the trainers program for people from UK, Nigeria, Togo, Liberia, Burkina Faso, Tanzania, South Africa, and others. Participants were taken through the Ampe Sports, Chaskele Sports, GHskyball, etc. and the program was completed after five days. Nigeria became the first country in Africa to register with the Ampe Sports organizing committee to compete with Ghana. In 24 November 2018, Ghana hosted Nigeria at the Theodosia Okoh Hockey Stadium in Accra. Four ladies trained from Liberia and United Kingdom were booked to contest with Ghana at the Accra Hockey Stadium after the much anticipated match between Ghana and Nigeria which Ghana won.

Description of the game Ampe

== Greater Accra City Historic Ampe Sports Competition ==
On Saturday, 8 December 2018, a successful Ampe Sports tournament organized by Hon occurred. Alfred Adjei (Accra Metropolitan Assembly Presiding Member) for the Avenor Electoral Areas comprising Manmomon, Caprice, Kwadjoman and Otaten. The event was in partnership with Be-Great Promotions which is the official organization mandated to manage Ampe Sports tournament across all levels. With a large range of spectators, Otaten team, through their indefatigable performance, recorded the historic success of winning the first ever Ampe Sports competition organize in the City of Accra, Ghana.

== Notes ==
- Listening to the Silence: African Cross Rhythms. Perf. John Collins. 2004 Films for the Humanities & Sciences.
