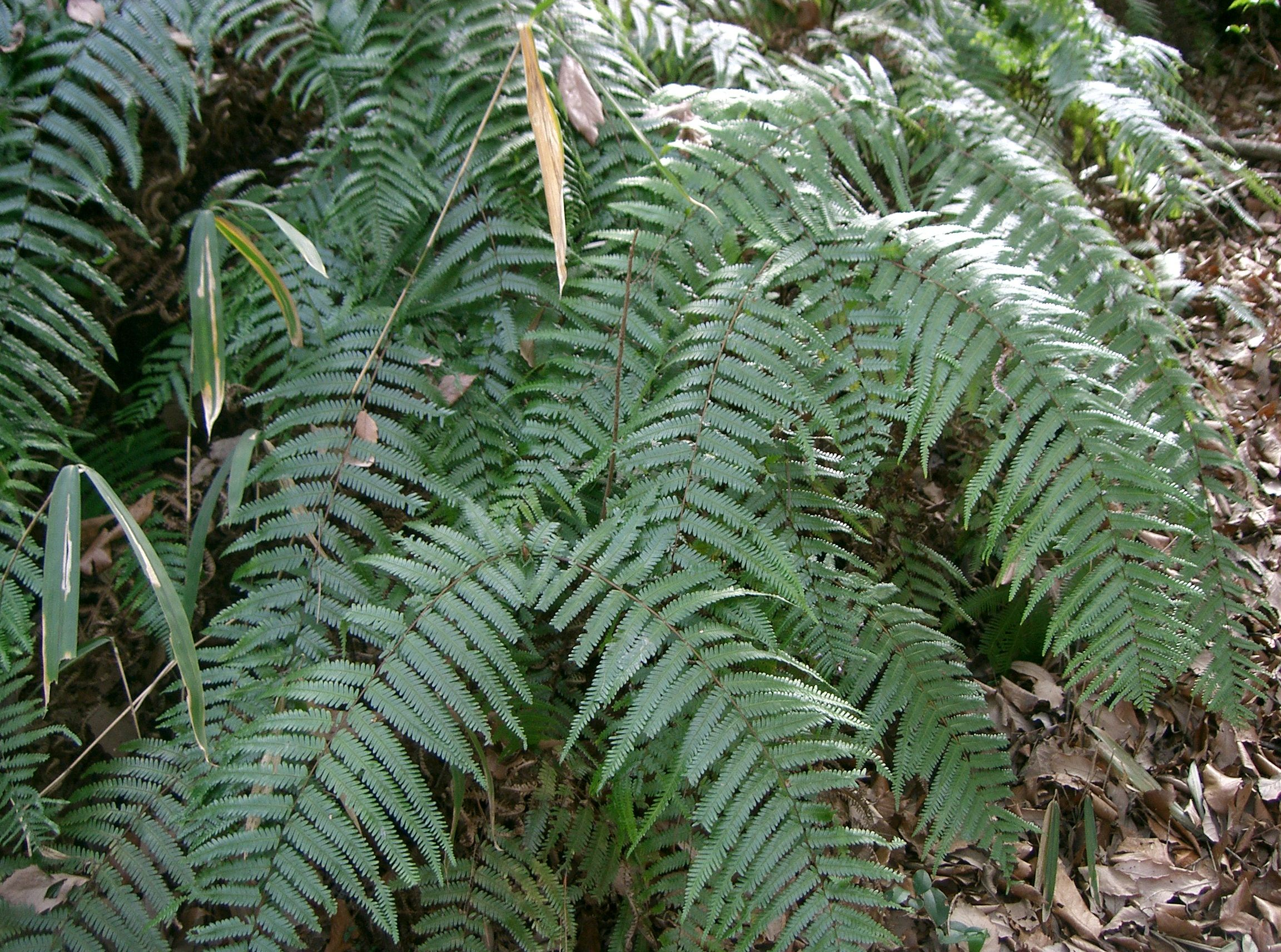
- Diplopterygium pinnatum

Scientific classification
- Kingdom: Plantae
- Clade: Embryophytes
- Clade: Tracheophytes
- Division: Polypodiophyta
- Class: Polypodiopsida
- Order: Gleicheniales
- Family: Gleicheniaceae; C.Presl

Genera
- Dicranopteris Bernh.; Diplopterygium (Diels) Nakai; Gleichenella Ching; Gleichenia Sm.; Rouxopteris Hong M.Liu; Sticheropsis L.V.Lima, Salino & T.E.Almeida; Sticherus C.Presl; Stromatopteris Mett.

Synonyms
- Dicranopteridaceae Ching 1954 ex Doweld 2001; Stromatopteridaceae (Nakai) Bierh.

= Gleicheniaceae =

Forked ferns Temporal range: Early Permian–Recent

Family of ferns

The forked ferns are the family Gleicheniaceae, which includes eight genera and about 160 known species. The formerly independent families Dicranopteridaceae and Stromatopteridaceae are generally included in the Gleicheniaceae, whereas the Dipteridaceae and Matoniaceae, although closely related, are considered separate families by most authors.

== Description ==
These tropical ferns are the most widespread living lineage of Gleicheniales. Their rhizomes have a "vitalized" protostele or in some taxa a solenostele. The leaves are indeterminate, with pseudodichotomously forked leaves except in Stromatopteris, and free veins. Stromatopteris also differs from the other species in having an achlorophyllous and subterranean gametophyte. The sori are abaxial but not marginal and carry 5–15 exindusiate round sporangia each. These have a transverse-oblique annulus and contain 128 to 800 bilateral or globose-tetrahedral spores. The sori and sporangia mature at the same time, and the spores grow into surface-dwelling green prothalli beset with club-shaped hairs.

== Systematics ==
There is some dispute about ranking these ferns. They are typically placed in the order Gleicheniales. They may alternatively be considered a subclass Gleicheniatae or class Gleichenopsida, so that a distinct taxon can be established for the leptosporangiate ferns. In this case, the Gleicheniaceae are upranked to an order and receive the name Gleicheniales. Irrespective of their modern taxonomic treatment, the Gleicheniaceae were formerly included in the order Polypodiales. However, the ferns in the loose sense are much too diverse a group to be shoehorned into one taxon at such a low rank.

The Triassic Antarctipteris and Gleichenipteris are sometimes ascribed to the Gleicheniaceae, but are probably better considered Gleicheniales incertae sedis. There are seven extant genera recognized as of February 2020

Phylogeny of Gleicheniaceae by Nitta et al. 2022 and Fern Tree of Life:

- Gleicheniaceae
  - Rouxopteris Liu 2020
  - - - Diplopterygium Nakai 1950
      - - Gleichenella Ching 1940
        - Dicranopteris Bernhardi 1805
    - - - Stromatopteris Mettenius 1861
        - Gleichenia Smith 1973
      - Sticherus Presl 1836
