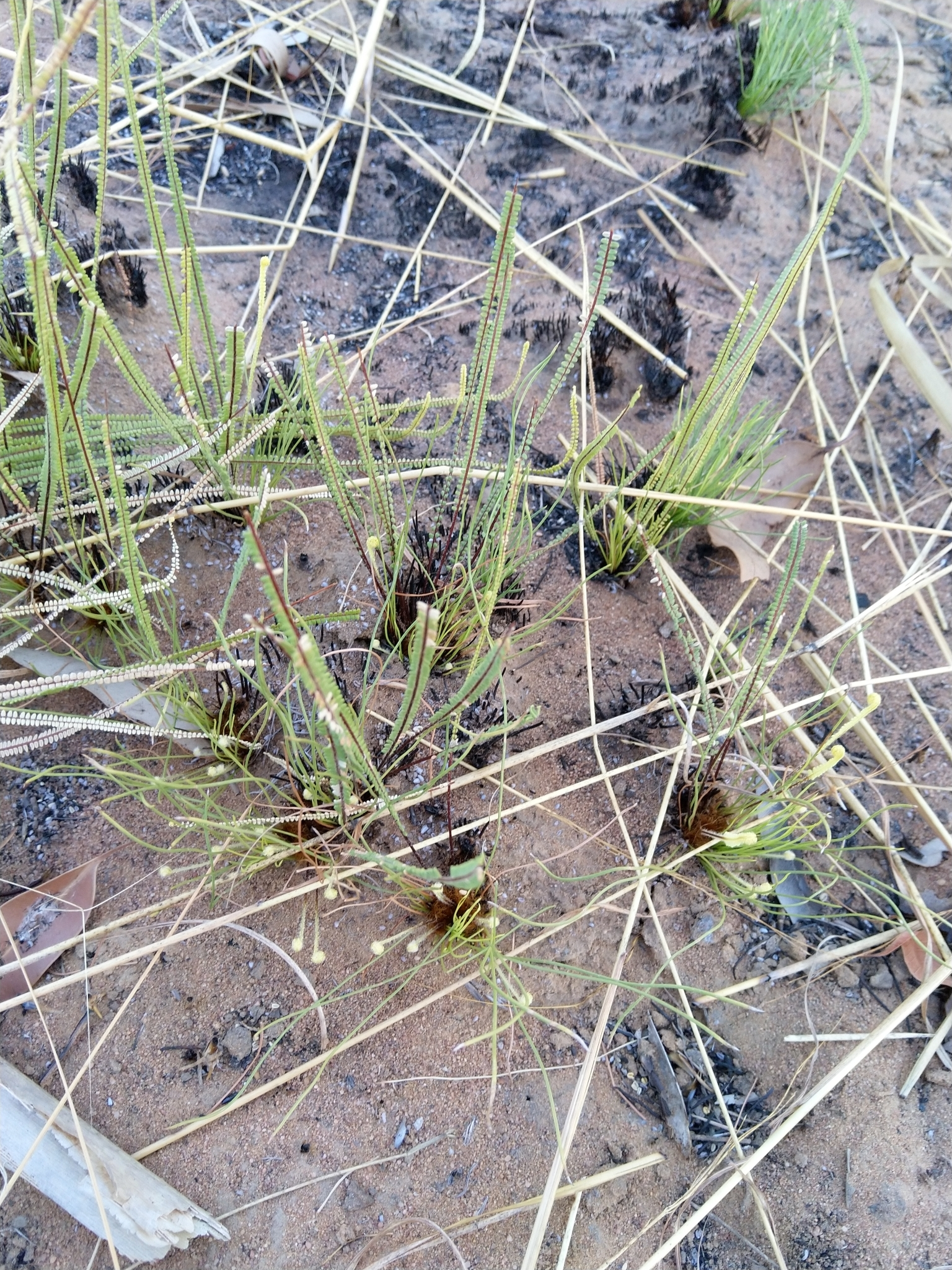

Scientific classification
- Kingdom: Plantae
- Clade: Tracheophytes
- Division: Polypodiophyta
- Class: Polypodiopsida
- Order: Polypodiales
- Family: Pteridaceae
- Genus: Pteris
- Species: P. platyzomopsis

Binomial name
- Pteris platyzomopsis Christenh. & H.Schneid.

Synonyms
- Platyzoma microphyllum R.Br.

= Pteris platyzomopsis =

Species of fern

Pteris platyzomopsis, synonym Platyzoma microphyllum, is a species of fern in the family Pteridaceae. When placed in the genus Platyzoma, it was the only species; the genus was sometimes placed in its own family, Platyzomaceae. The species is native to northern Australia, occurring in the Kimberley region of Western Australia, in the Northern Territory and Queensland, and in northern New South Wales, where it is considered endangered. Vernacular names include braid fern.

== Characteristics ==
Pteris platyzomopsis is unusual among ferns in that it may display incipient heterospory.

Microsporangia produce 32 microspores, each 71-101μm in diameter. Megasporangia produce 16 megaspores, each 163-183μm in diameter. Microspores produce a filamentous microgametophyte, which lacks rhizoids and gives rise only to antheridia. Megaspores produce spatulate megagametophytes with rhizoids, which produce archegonia. Megagametophytes may later produce antheridia, making them functionally bisexual. Development of gametophytes is not endosporic.

== Taxonomy ==
Pteris platyzomopsis has been known by the synonym Platyzoma microphyllum. The genus Platyzoma has been placed as the only species in family Platyzomataceae. Tryon has speculated that the species, with its incipient heterospory, unusual chromosome number (2n=78) and other features, may represent a stage transitional to the heterosporous aquatic ferns.

In 1827 Nicaise Auguste Desvaux included in Platyzoma additional species, such as Gleichenia alpina, Gleichenia dicarpa and Gleichenia rupestris, which are currently regarded by most scholars as part of the genus Gleichenia.

In 2011, Christenhusz et al. placed Platyzoma within the genus Pteris and transferred the Platyzoma microphyllum R.Br. to Pteris platyzomopsis Christenh. & H.Schneid., as the name Pteris microphylla was already in use. The transfer is accepted by the Checklist of Ferns and Lycophytes of the World and Plants of the World Online.
