= Ericodesma scruposa =

Scientific classification
- Kingdom: Animalia
- Phylum: Arthropoda
- Clade: Pancrustacea
- Class: Insecta
- Order: Lepidoptera
- Family: Tortricidae
- Genus: Ericodesma
- Species: E. scruposa

Binomial name
- Ericodesma scruposa (Philpott, 1924)

Synonyms
- Tortrix scruposa Philpott, 1924; Tortrix maculosa Philpott, 1927; Ericodesma maculosa (Philpott, 1927)

Species of moth endemic to New Zealand

Ericodesma scruposa, also known as the Gleichenia ugly nestmaker, is a species of moth of the family Tortricidae. It was first described by Alfred Philpott in 1924. This species is endemic to New Zealand and has been observed in the North and South Islands. This moth inhabits subalpine scrub, gumlands, peatlands and heathland where its larval host plants are present. The larval host plants are in the genus Gleichenia and include Gleichenia dicarpa. The larvae live inside silken webbing around the opening leaf tips of their host plants. Adults are on the wing from October until February. This species plays host to Chalcidoid wasps in the genus Antrocephalus.

== Taxonomy ==
This species was first described by Alfred Philpott in 1924 using the male holotype and originally named Tortrix scruposa. In 1927 Philpott, thinking he was describing a new species, named this moth Tortrix maculosa. George Hudson discussed and illustrated this species under the name T. scruposa in his 1928 book The butterflies and moths of New Zealand. In 1939 Hudson synonymised T. maculosa with T. scruposa. In 1971 John S. Dugale placed this species in the genus Ericodesma. The male holotype, collected by C. C. Fenwick at Mount Ruapehu at approximately 4,000 feet (1,200 m), is held at Te Papa.

== Description ==
Male holotype.

Living specimen

Philpott described the male adult of this species as follows:

♂. 17 mm. Head greyish-white. Palpi grey, terminal segment short and bluntly pointed. Antennae grey, ciliation 1. Thorax grey, patagia brown. Abdomen (missing). Legs grey, anterior pair infuscated. Fore-wings strongly arched at base, thence straight to apex, apex rounded, termen rounded, oblique; white; markings bronzy-brown; basal patch indicated by an irregular fascia, projecting at the middle; two curved fasciae beyond this, second broken up into spots; median fascia directed towards tornus, evenly dilated from costa, interrupted at 2/3; four or five interrupted irregular fasciae between median fascia and apex: cilia greyish-white darker round apex. Hindwings fuscous grey: cilia grey with a darker basal line.

The larva is colour green with a dark head and is between 5 and 8 mm long when mature.

== Distribution ==
This species is endemic to New Zealand and has been observed in both the North and South Islands.

== Habitat and host ==
Larval host plant Gleichenia dicarpa.

This species inhabits subalpine scrub as well as gumlands and peatlands where its host plants are present. Dugdale also stated that this species belongs to a genus of "small grey tortricids associated with heathland Pimelea". The larval host of this moth are species in the genus Gleichenia including Gleichenia dicarpa.

== Behaviour ==
The larvae live inside silken webbing around the opening leaf tips of Gleichenia dicarpa. Adults have been observed on the wing from October to February.

== Predators ==
This species plays host to Chalcidoid wasps in the genus Antrocephalus.
