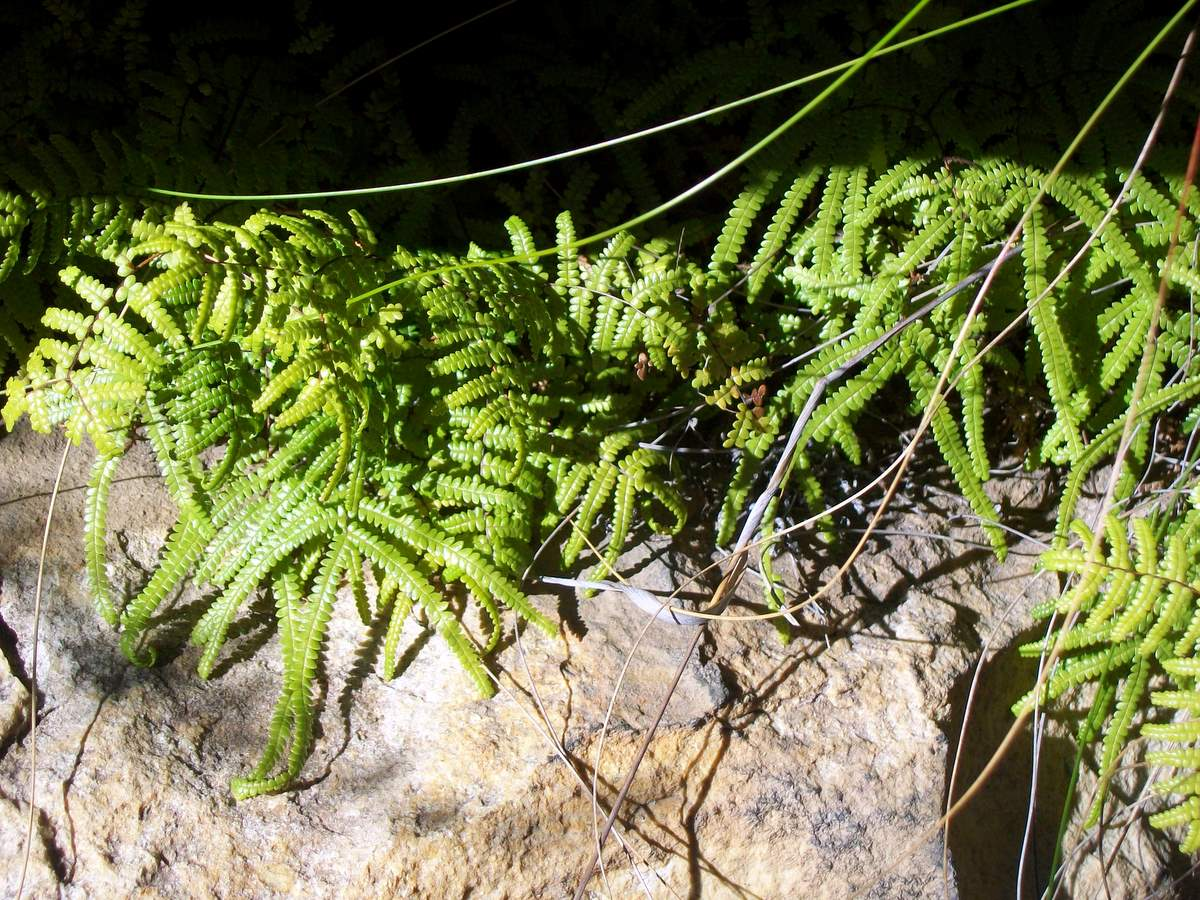
- Coral fern at Blue Mountains National Park, Australia

Scientific classification
- Kingdom: Plantae
- Clade: Tracheophytes
- Division: Polypodiophyta
- Class: Polypodiopsida
- Order: Gleicheniales
- Family: Gleicheniaceae
- Genus: Gleichenia
- Species: G. rupestris

Binomial name
- Gleichenia rupestris R.Br.

Synonyms
- Platyzoma rupestre Mertensia rupestris Gleicheniastrum rupestre Calymella rupestris Gleichenia circinnata var. rupestris

= Gleichenia rupestris =

Species of fern

Gleichenia rupestris is a small fern growing in eastern Australia. Referred to as one of the coral ferns. The specific epithet rupestris refers to it being seen growing near rocks.

A common plant, often seen growing under waterfalls, in swamps, under cliffs, on rocks and in tall open forest. It prefers high humidity and good levels of sunshine and moisture.

It sometimes seen growing next to Gleichenia dicarpa and Gleichenia microphylla, however those plants have a rough hairy stem, and the stem of Gleichenia rupestris is smooth and glossy.

This plant first appeared in scientific literature in the Prodromus Florae Novae Hollandiae in the year 1810, authored by Robert Brown.
