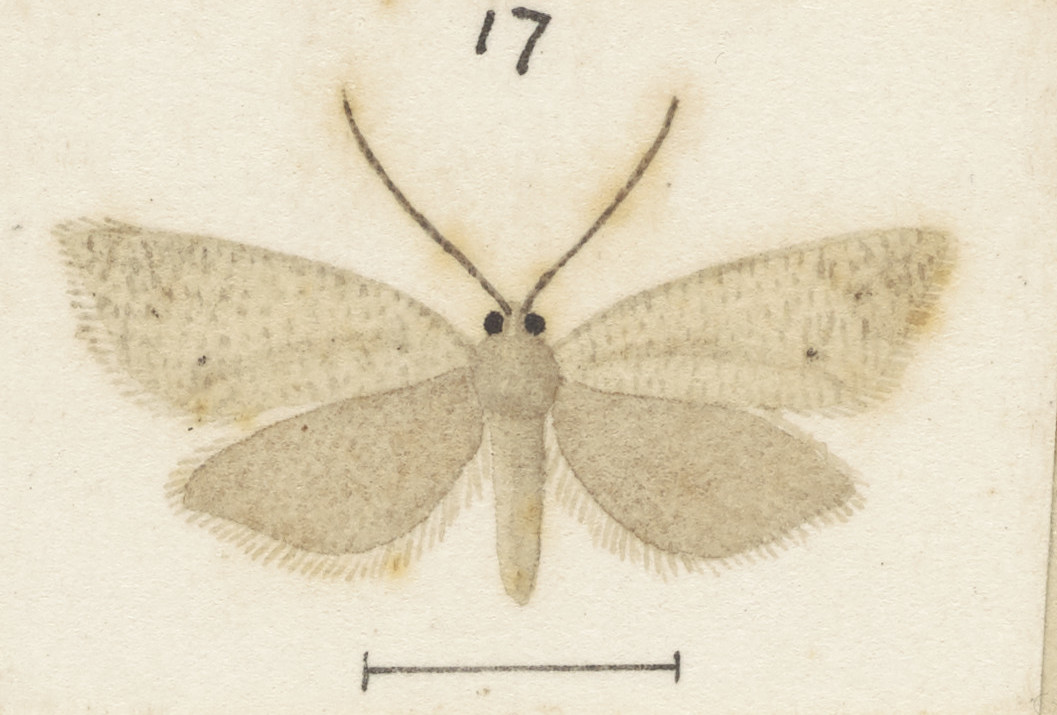

Conservation status
- Declining (NZ TCS)

Scientific classification
- Kingdom: Animalia
- Phylum: Arthropoda
- Clade: Pancrustacea
- Class: Insecta
- Order: Lepidoptera
- Family: Tortricidae
- Genus: Ericodesma
- Species: E. aerodana

Binomial name
- Ericodesma aerodana (Meyrick, 1881)

Synonyms
- Tortrix aerodana Meyrick, 1881; Tortrix indigestana Meyrick, 1881

= Ericodesma aerodana =

Species of moth

Ericodesma aerodana is a species of moth of the family Tortricidae. It is endemic to New Zealand and is found in the North and South Islands. The species inhabits sand dunes and larvae feed on Pimelea prostrata. Adults are on the wing from October to January and are active at twilight. This species is classified as "At Risk, Declining" by the Department of Conservation as its larval host plant is under threat from habitat loss and the invasive to New Zealand plant, sea spurge.

== Taxonomy ==
This moth was first described by Edward Meyrick in 1881 using specimens collected in Hamilton in January. He named the species Tortrix aerodana. George Vernon Hudson discussed and illustrated this species in his 1928 book under the names Tortrix indigestana as well as T. aerodana. In 1971 John S. Dugdale assigned T. aerodana to the genus Ericodesma. The lectotype specimen is held at the Natural History Museum, London.

== Description ==
Meyrick described the moth as follows:

♂︎ 4 3/4"-5 1/4". Head, palpi, and thorax whitish-grey mixed with dark grey. Antennae dark fuscous-grey, sometimes with whitish annulations. Abdomen light grey, anal tuft whitish. Legs grey-whitish, anterior and middle tibiae and tarsi suffused with dark fuscous. Forewings narrow, costa slightly arched, hindmargin very obliquely rounded; dark grey, irrorated with ashy-whitish and black scales; sometimes there is a distinct ochreous slender oblique fascia from middle of costa to inner margin before anal angle, and costal spot at three-fourths, but these are often imperceptible; cilia whitish-grey mixed with darker. Hindwings dark grey; cilia paler, with a dark grey line near base. ♀︎ 6 1/2"-7". Head, etcetera, as in male. Abdomen whitish-ochreous. Forewings with costa somewhat more arched towards base, hindmargin very oblique; paler than in male, without trace of fascia : cilia whitish. Hindwings whitish, posteriorly whitish-grey; cilia white, with a faint grey line near base.

== Distribution ==
This species is endemic to New Zealand. The species can be found in Waikato, Bay of Plenty, Taupō, Taranaki, Whanganui, Wellington, Marlborough & Marlborough Sounds, Kaikōura, Mid Canterbury.

== Biology, behaviour and habitat ==
Adults are on wing from October to January. Adult moths are active at twilight. E. areodana inhabits sand dune habitat.

== Host species ==
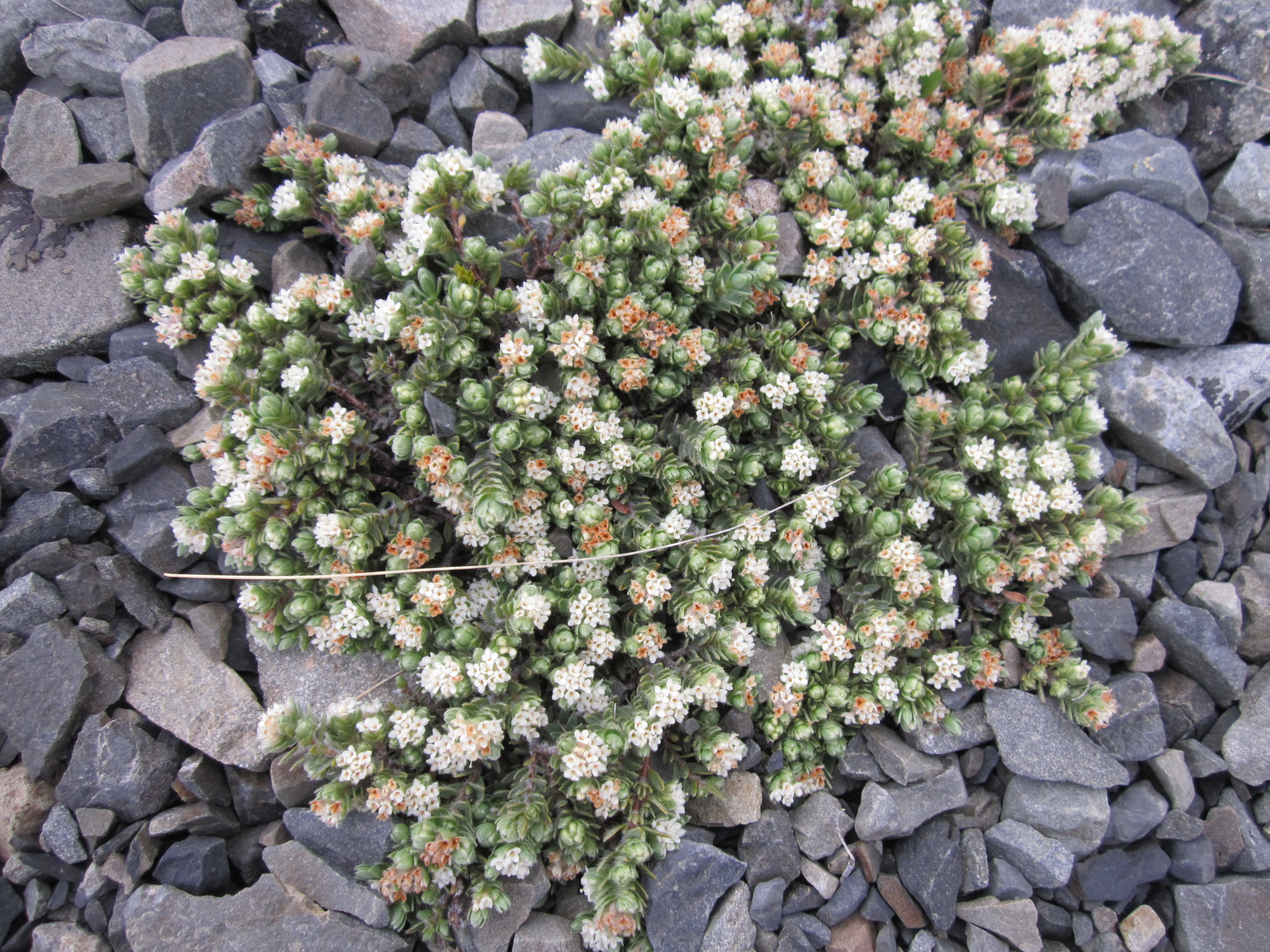
Pimelea prostrata, larval host species of E. aerodana.

The larvae feed on Pimelea prostrata.

== Conservation status ==
This species has been classified as having the "At Risk, Declining" conservation status under the New Zealand Threat Classification System. The survival of this moth is dependent upon the survival of its host plants. These are under threat as a result of habitat loss. The moth and its host plant is also under threat by the sea spurge.
