= Ericodesma liquidana =

Scientific classification
- Kingdom: Animalia
- Phylum: Arthropoda
- Class: Insecta
- Order: Lepidoptera
- Family: Tortricidae
- Genus: Ericodesma
- Species: E. liquidana

Binomial name
- Ericodesma liquidana (Meyrick, 1881)

Synonyms
- Cacoecia liquidana Meyrick, 1881

Species of moth

Ericodesma liquidana is a species of moth of the family Tortricidae. It is found in Australia, where it has been recorded from New South Wales and Tasmania. The habitat consists of open woodland and heathland.

The wingspan is about 23 mm.

The larvae feed on Lavandufa stoechas.
