= Ericodesma antilecta =

Scientific classification
- Kingdom: Animalia
- Phylum: Arthropoda
- Class: Insecta
- Order: Lepidoptera
- Family: Tortricidae
- Genus: Ericodesma
- Species: E. antilecta

Binomial name
- Ericodesma antilecta (Turner, 1939)

Synonyms
- Tortrix antilecta Turner, 1939

Species of moth

Ericodesma antilecta is a species of moth of the family Tortricidae. It is found in Australia, where it has been recorded from Tasmania.

The wingspan is about 16.5 mm.
