= Ericodesma =

Scientific classification
- Domain: Eukaryota
- Kingdom: Animalia
- Phylum: Arthropoda
- Class: Insecta
- Order: Lepidoptera
- Family: Tortricidae
- Subfamily: Tortricinae
- Genus: Ericodesma; Dugdale, 1971

Genus of tortrix moths

Ericodesma is a genus of moths belonging to the subfamily Tortricinae of the family Tortricidae.

== Species ==
- Ericodesma adoxodes (Turner, 1939)
- Ericodesma aerodana (Meyrick, 1881)
- Ericodesma antilecta (Turner, 1939)
- Ericodesma argentosa (Philpott, 1924)
- Ericodesma concordana (Meyrick, 1881)
- Ericodesma cuneata (Clarke, 1926)
- Ericodesma indigestana (Meyrick, 1881)
- Ericodesma isochroa (Meyrick, 1910)
- Ericodesma leptosticha (Turner, 1916)
- Ericodesma liquidana (Meyrick, 1881)
- Ericodesma melanosperma (Meyrick, 1916)
- Ericodesma pallida (Turner, 1945)
- Ericodesma scruposa (Philpott, 1924)
- Ericodesma spodophanes (Turner, 1945)

== See also ==
- List of Tortricidae genera
