= Ericodesma adoxodes =

Scientific classification
- Kingdom: Animalia
- Phylum: Arthropoda
- Class: Insecta
- Order: Lepidoptera
- Family: Tortricidae
- Genus: Ericodesma
- Species: E. adoxodes

Binomial name
- Ericodesma adoxodes (Turner, 1939)

Synonyms
- Tortrix adoxodes Turner, 1939

Species of moth

Ericodesma adoxodes is a species of moth of the family Tortricidae. It is found in Australia, where it has been recorded from Tasmania. The habitat consists of rainforests and mixed forests at altitudes between 200 and 1,000 meters.

The wingspan is about 14.5–15 mm.

The larvae feed on Nothofagus cunninghamii.
