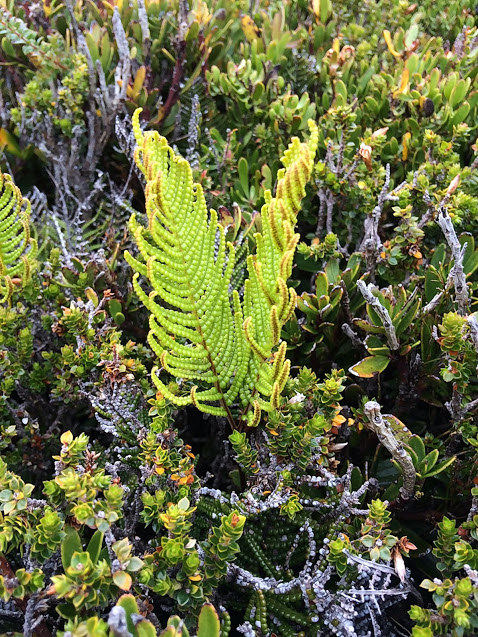

Scientific classification
- Kingdom: Plantae
- Clade: Tracheophytes
- Division: Polypodiophyta
- Class: Polypodiopsida
- Order: Gleicheniales
- Family: Gleicheniaceae
- Genus: Gleichenia
- Species: G. abscida

Binomial name
- Gleichenia abscida Rodway

= Gleichenia abscida =

Dwarf coral fern

Species of fern

Gleichenia abscida, commonly known as dwarf coral fern, is an uncommon alpine fern found in southwestern Tasmania. Described by English born dentist and botanist Leonard Rodway, that which distinguishes G. abscida the most from all other species of Gleichenia is its frond. While each other species of Gleichenia have a repetitively branching frond, G. abscida's frond consists of just two blades, with the apical axil between these two blades lacking meristematic tissue.

== Morphology ==
Multiple stipes (25–40), 9–46 cm long, with fronds up to 65 cm in length, arise from long creeping rhizomes 2.5–3.5 mm in diameter. Scaly rounded pinnules 1–2 mm across, with flat adaxial surfaces and strongly recurved into an abaxial pouch, hold sori of 2–4 sporangia.

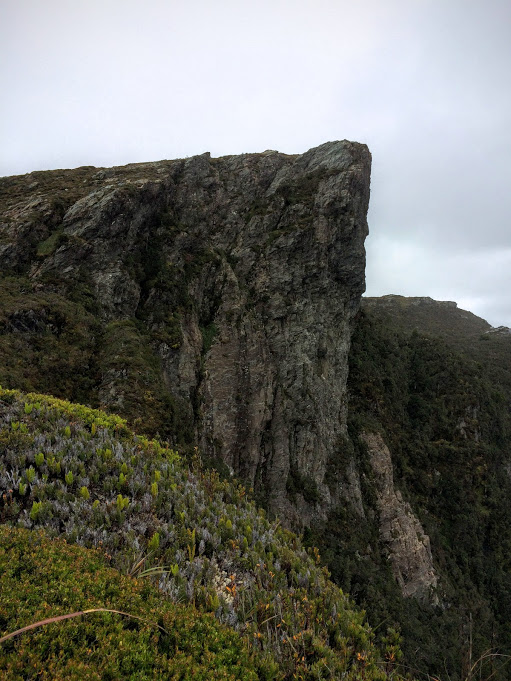
G. abscida growing in its typical exposed alpine habitat.
