= Ericodesma isochroa =

Scientific classification
- Kingdom: Animalia
- Phylum: Arthropoda
- Class: Insecta
- Order: Lepidoptera
- Family: Tortricidae
- Genus: Ericodesma
- Species: E. isochroa

Binomial name
- Ericodesma isochroa (Meyrick, 1910)

Synonyms
- Tortrix isochroa Meyrick, 1910

Species of moth

Ericodesma isochroa is a species of moth of the family Tortricidae. It is found in Australia, where it has been recorded from Western Australia.

The wingspan is about 15 mm.
