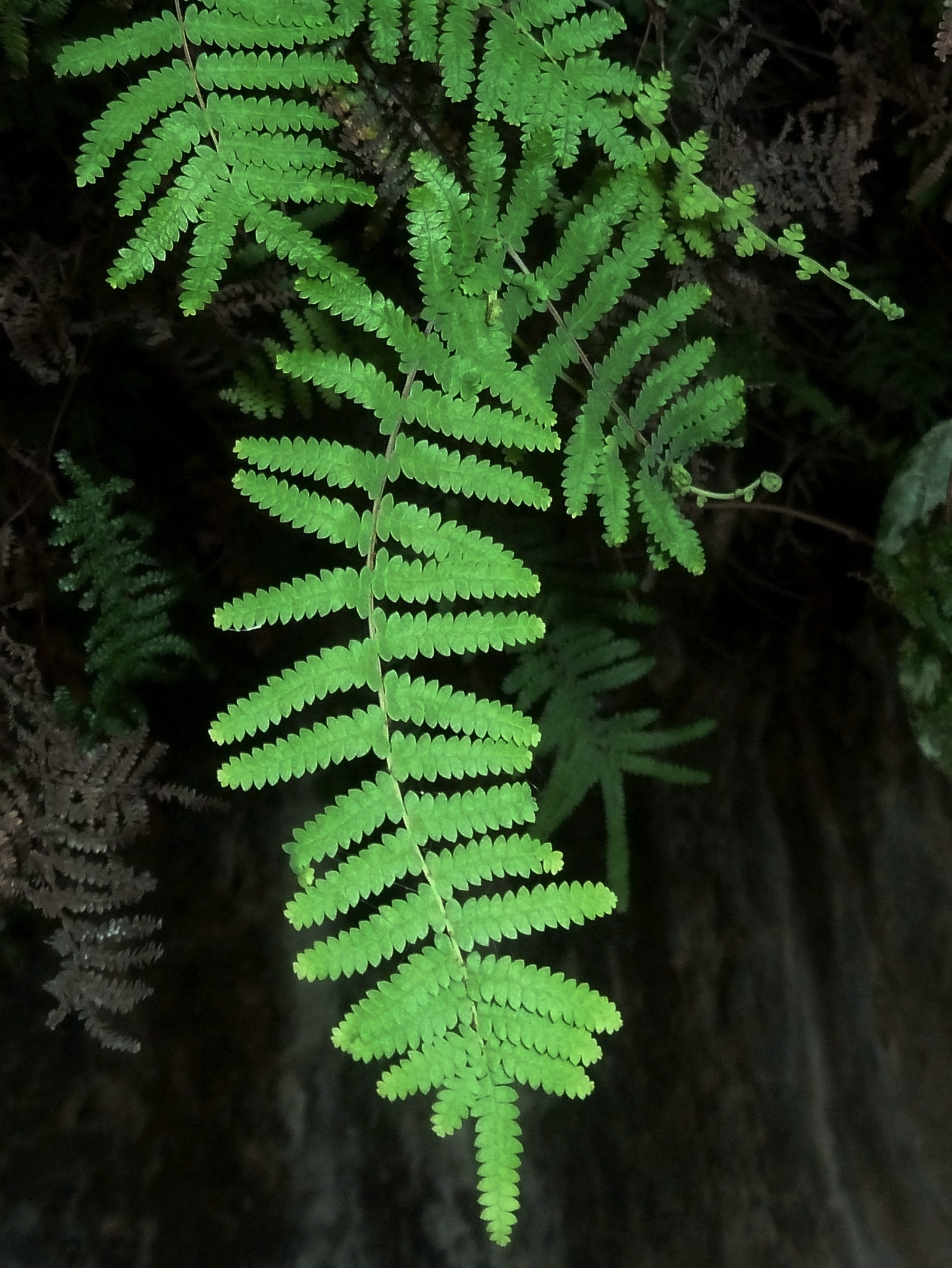
- Pendent, cremnophytic habit on a sheltered sandstone overhang

Scientific classification
- Kingdom: Plantae
- Clade: Tracheophytes
- Division: Polypodiophyta
- Class: Polypodiopsida
- Order: Gleicheniales
- Family: Gleicheniaceae
- Genus: Gleichenia
- Species: G. polypodioides

Binomial name
- Gleichenia polypodioides (L.) Sm.

Synonyms
- Onoclea polypodioides L.

= Gleichenia polypodioides =

Coral fern

Species of fern

Gleichenia polypodioides (L.) Sm., commonly known as coral fern, kystervaring ('kyster' meaning 'coastal' and of possible Scandinavian derivation) or ystervaring (meaning 'iron fern' in Afrikaans) due to its glabrous, brown, wiry stipes. The species is widespread in south- and east tropical Africa, southern Africa and the western Indian Ocean region. It occurs naturally in a broad coastal belt in South Africa, Lesotho, Eswatini, Angola, Malawi, Burundi, Tanzania, Mozambique, Zimbabwe, Mauritius, Réunion, Amsterdam Island and Madagascar, and was first described by Carl Linnaeus in 1771 under the name Onoclea polypodioides. Often forming dense and impenetrable thickets, sometimes over large areas, this rhizomatous perennial is an important pioneer in disturbed areas such as pine plantations. It is often mistakenly seen as an exotic invader rather than as a useful rehabilitation plant, a source of peat and growing medium, while showing exceptional resistance to herbicides.

Rhizome brown, 1–2.5 mm. in diam., creeping, with long-spined dark-brown scales up to 0.5 mm. in diam. (including spines), with fronds spaced 2–20 cm. apart. Stipe castaneous, up to 60 cm. long and up to 1.5 mm. in diam., glabrous or with a few scales similar to those on the rhizome, shallowly sulcate. Frond bifurcate to reniform-lunate in outline, with 1 (rarely 2) level of false dichotomy in each lateral branch system arising from each side of the terminal bud; all branches bearing distant foliar segments. Aborted apical buds up to 1.2 mm. long, clothed in dark-brown lanceolate laciniate scales (sometimes with black spines). Pinnules (foliar segments) linear, up to 7 x 0.75 cm., pinnate, usually glabrous (but sometimes set with brown laciniate scales), divided into sessile rounded entire triangular lobes, 3 x 2 mm., green to glaucous below. Sori partially immersed in the lamina, consisting of 2–4 sporangia, each in a separate but adjoining pit.

— E. A. C. L. E. Schelpe - Flora Zambesiaca

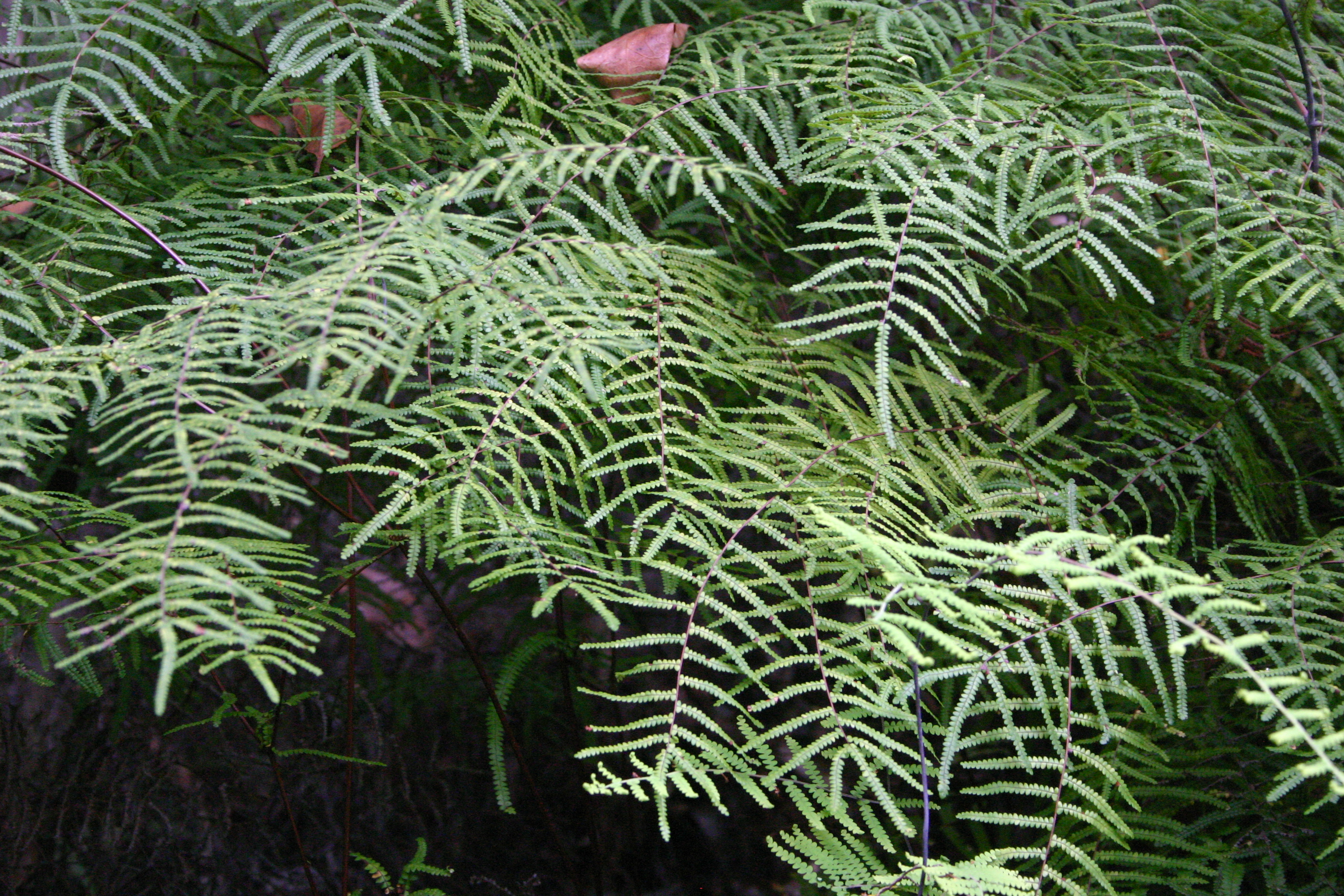
Fronds covering an earthbank at Bloukrans Pass, South Africa

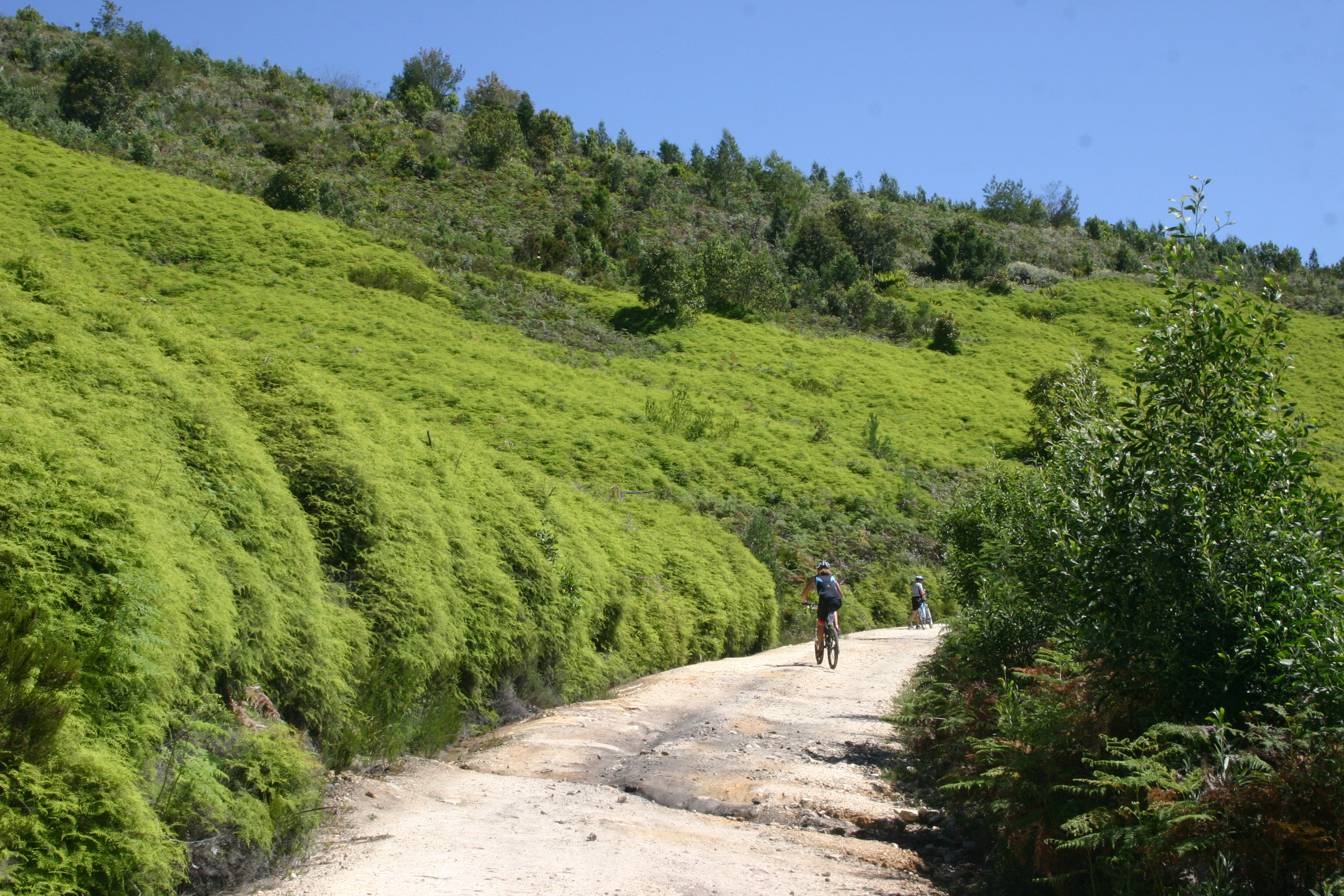
Monospecific stand on exposed ridge near Karatara, South Africa

The genus is named after the German botanist W.F. von Gleichen, while "polypodioides" denotes a resemblance to Polypodium which also has sori sunk into the frond surface. Gleichenia polypodioides is one of 12 species in the genus, and occurs on sheltered rocks and slopes, along stream- and earthbanks, on road embankments and other disturbed areas, in cool regions of high rainfall or frequent mist, on sites enjoying full sun or light shade. In the subtropics it occurs at elevations from 1,220 to 1,870 m, but in South Africa it is present near sea level.

== Synonyms ==
- Calymella polypodioides (L.) Ching
- Gleichenia argentea Kaulf.
- Gleichenia glauca Sw.
- Mertensia caeruleo-glauca Poir.
- Onoclea polypodioides L.
