= Ericodesma indigestana =

Scientific classification
- Kingdom: Animalia
- Phylum: Arthropoda
- Class: Insecta
- Order: Lepidoptera
- Family: Tortricidae
- Genus: Ericodesma
- Species: E. indigestana

Binomial name
- Ericodesma indigestana (Meyrick, 1881)

Synonyms
- Tortrix indigestana Meyrick, 1881

Species of moth

Ericodesma indigestana is a species of moth of the family Tortricidae. It is found in Australia, where it has been recorded from New South Wales, Victoria and Tasmania. The habitat consists of heathland and open treeless areas.

The wingspan is about 16 mm.
