= Ericodesma concordana =

Scientific classification
- Kingdom: Animalia
- Phylum: Arthropoda
- Class: Insecta
- Order: Lepidoptera
- Family: Tortricidae
- Genus: Ericodesma
- Species: E. concordana

Binomial name
- Ericodesma concordana (Meyrick, 1881)

Synonyms
- Tortrix concordana Meyrick, 1881

Species of moth

Ericodesma concordana is a species of moth of the family Tortricidae. It is found in Australia, where it has been recorded from New South Wales, the Australian Capital Territory and Tasmania. The habitat consists of open forests and heathland.

The wingspan is about 17.5 mm.

The larvae have been recorded feeding on Hibbertia species.
