= Ericodesma argentosa =

Scientific classification
- Domain: Eukaryota
- Kingdom: Animalia
- Phylum: Arthropoda
- Class: Insecta
- Order: Lepidoptera
- Family: Tortricidae
- Genus: Ericodesma
- Species: E. argentosa

Binomial name
- Ericodesma argentosa (Philpott, 1924)

Synonyms
- Tortrix argentosa Philpott, 1924; Tortrix subdola Philpott, 1924

Species of moth

Ericodesma argentosa is a species of moth of the family Tortricidae. It is found in New Zealand.

The wingspan is 16–17 mm for both males and females. The forewings are silvery white, but the edge of the costa is blackish. The hindwings are pale greyish white.
