= Ericodesma leptosticha =

Scientific classification
- Domain: Eukaryota
- Kingdom: Animalia
- Phylum: Arthropoda
- Class: Insecta
- Order: Lepidoptera
- Family: Tortricidae
- Genus: Ericodesma
- Species: E. leptosticha

Binomial name
- Ericodesma leptosticha (Turner, 1916)

Synonyms
- Epichorista leptosticha Turner, 1916

Species of moth

Ericodesma leptosticha is a species of moth of the family Tortricidae. It is found in Australia, where it has been recorded from New South Wales.

The wingspan is 17–21 mm. The forewings are grey, irrorated (sprinkled) with pale ochreous. There is a white costal streak and the costal edge is dark fuscous near the base, where it becomes grey. The hindwings are grey.
