= Ericodesma spodophanes =

Scientific classification
- Domain: Eukaryota
- Kingdom: Animalia
- Phylum: Arthropoda
- Class: Insecta
- Order: Lepidoptera
- Family: Tortricidae
- Genus: Ericodesma
- Species: E. spodophanes

Binomial name
- Ericodesma spodophanes (Turner, 1945)

Synonyms
- Epichorista spodophanes Turner, 1945

Species of moth

Ericodesma spodophanes is a species of moth of the family Tortricidae. It is found in Australia, where it has been recorded from Victoria.

== Description ==
The wingspan is about 15.5 mm.
