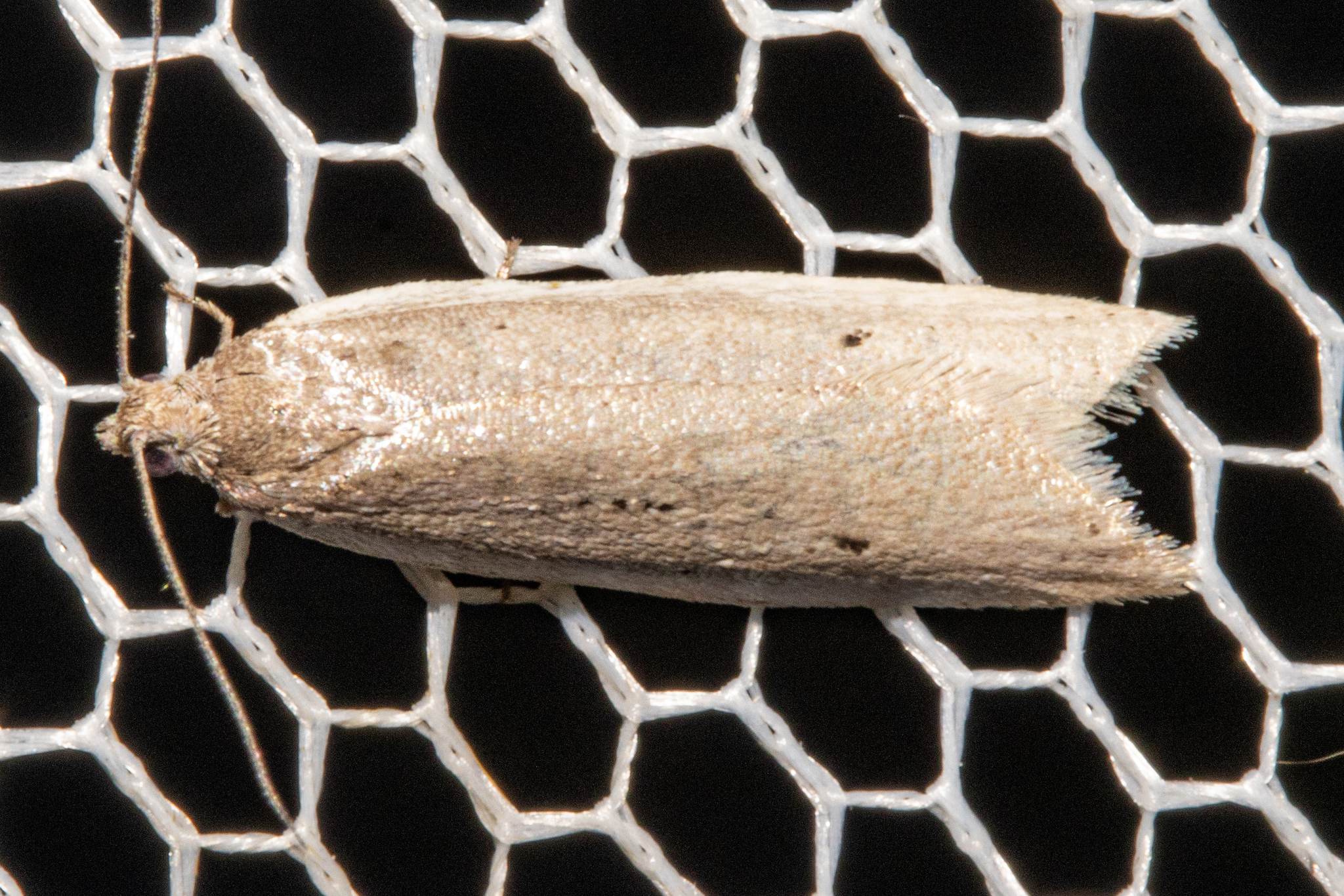

Scientific classification
- Kingdom: Animalia
- Phylum: Arthropoda
- Clade: Pancrustacea
- Class: Insecta
- Order: Lepidoptera
- Family: Tortricidae
- Genus: Ericodesma
- Species: E. melanosperma

Binomial name
- Ericodesma melanosperma (Meyrick, 1916)

Synonyms
- Tortrix melanosperma Meyrick, 1916

= Ericodesma melanosperma =

Species of moth

Ericodesma melanosperma is a species of moth of the family Tortricidae. This species was first described by Edward Meyrick in 1916. It is endemic to New Zealand.

== Taxonomy ==
This species was first described by Edward Meyrick in 1916 using a specimen collected by George Hudson at Arthur's Pass and named Tortrix melanosperma. In 1928 George Hudson discussed and illustrated this moth in his book The butterflies and moths of New Zealand. In 1971 John S. Dugdale placed this species in the genus Ericodesma and also described the larva of the species. The male holotype is held at the Natural History Museum, London.

== Description ==
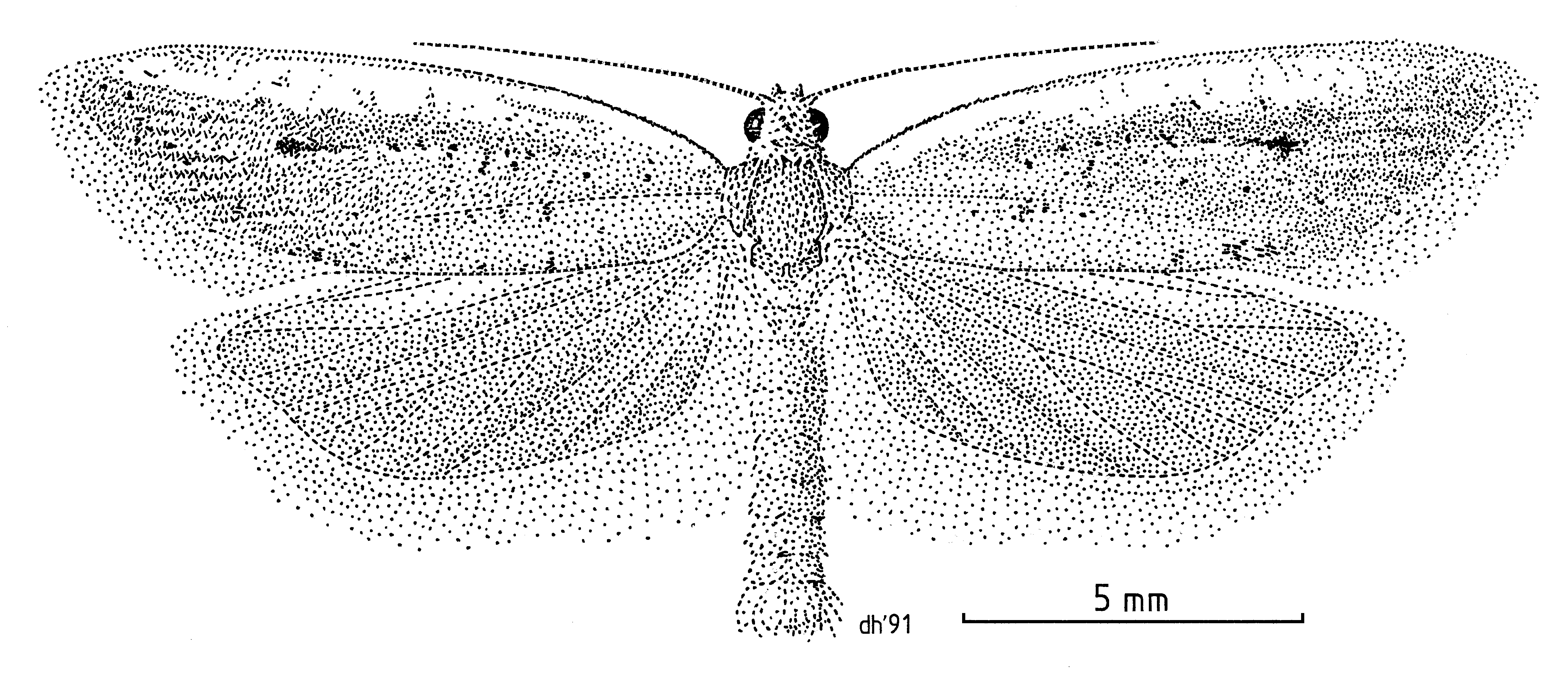
Male E. melanosperma.

Meyrick described this species as follows:

♂. 21 mm. Head, palpi, and thorax light grey, palpi moderate, ascending. Antennal ciliations 1. Abdomen pale ochreous-grey, anal tuft ochreous-whitish. Forewings elongate, costa moderately arched, without fold, apex tolerably pointed, termen nearly straight, rather strongly oblique, pale grey, with scattered black scales tending to form rows; costa rather broadly suffused with whitish; a conspicuous black dot in disc at 3/4 : cilia whitish-grey. Hindwings light grey : cilia whitish-grey.

== Distribution ==
This species is endemic to New Zealand. This species can be found in the South Island, Stewart Island and its islets and also Auckland and Campbell Islands. This species can be found in the subalpine zone to sea level.

== Behaviour ==
Adults are on the wing in January.

== Habitat and hosts ==
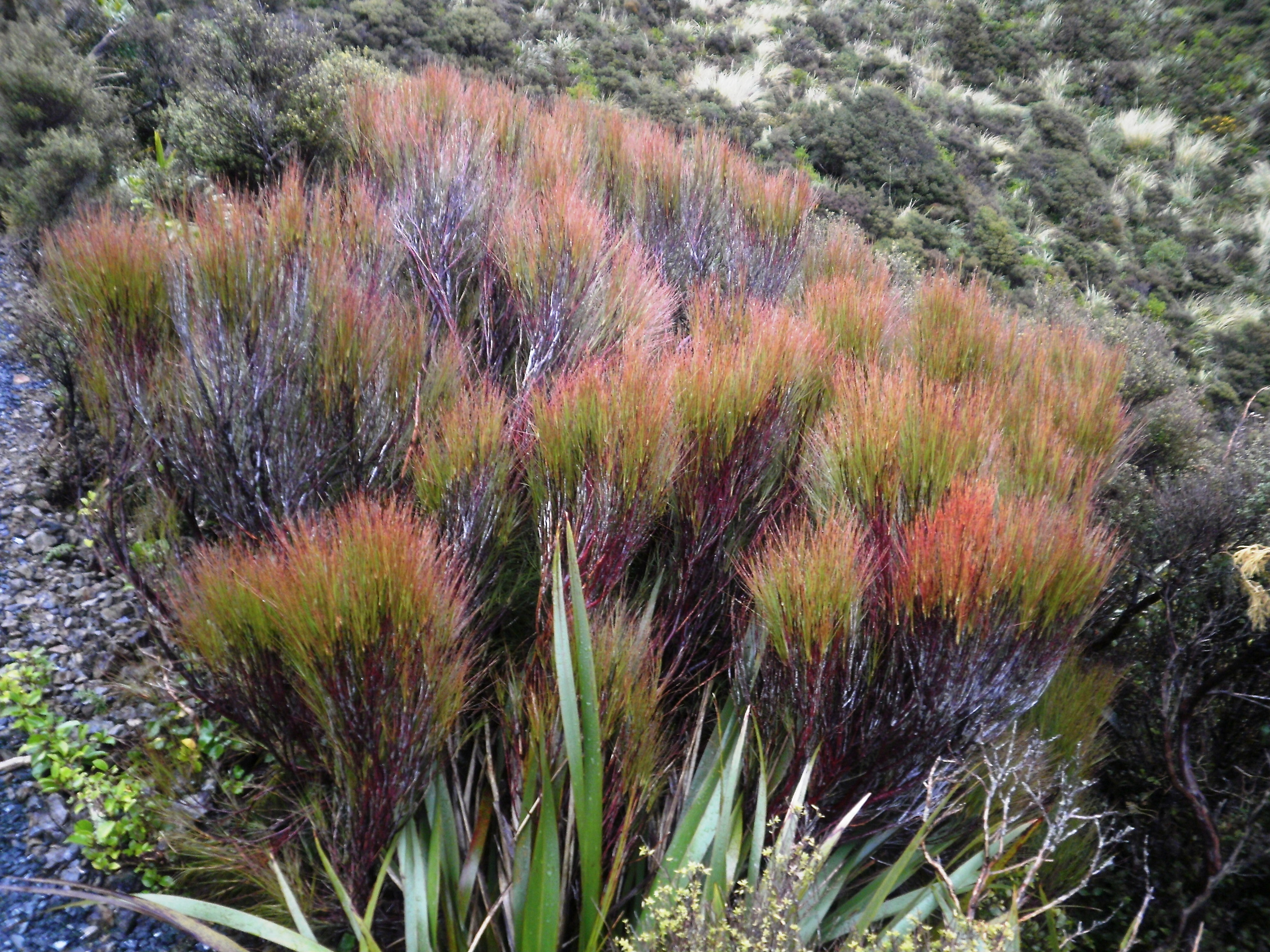
Larval host D. longifolium.

This species inhabits The larvae feed on Dracophyllum longifolium.
