= Ericodesma pallida =

Scientific classification
- Kingdom: Animalia
- Phylum: Arthropoda
- Class: Insecta
- Order: Lepidoptera
- Family: Tortricidae
- Genus: Ericodesma
- Species: E. pallida

Binomial name
- Ericodesma pallida (Turner, 1945)

Synonyms
- Cnephasia pallida Turner, 1945

Species of moth

Ericodesma pallida is a species of moth of the family Tortricidae. It is found in Australia, where it has been recorded from Western Australia.

The wingspan is about 12.5 mm.
