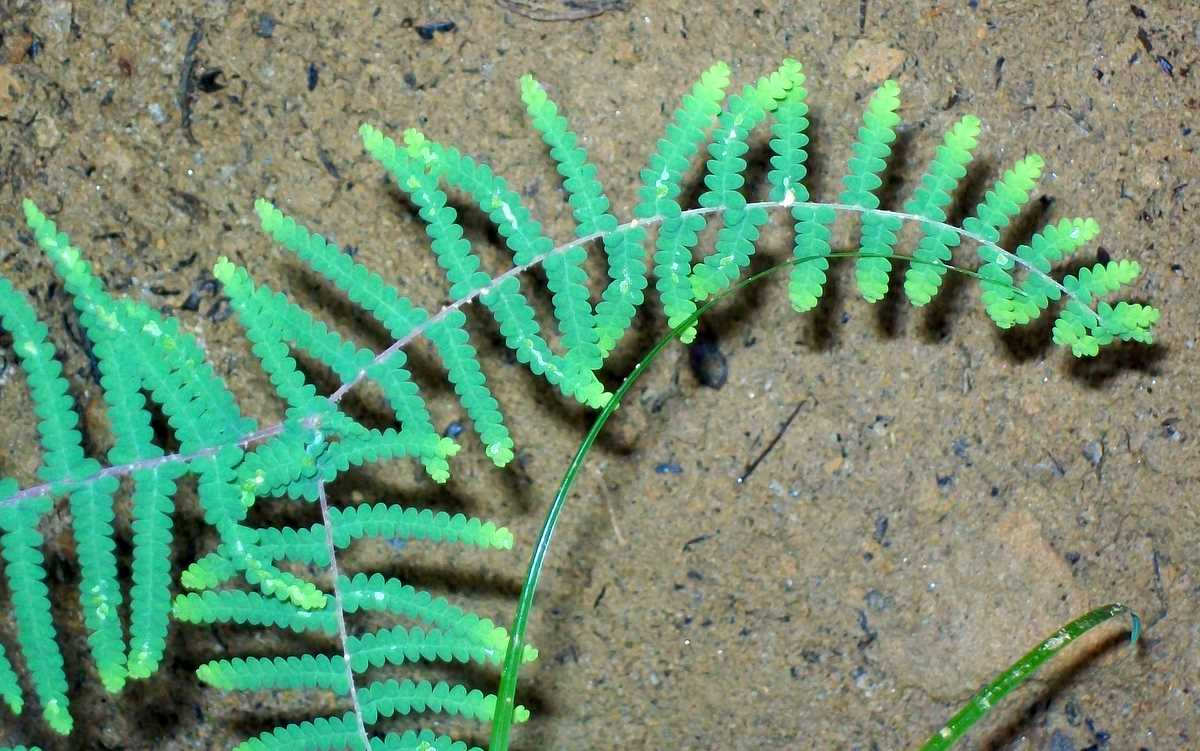
- G. microphylla at Elvina Bay, Ku-ring-gai Chase National Park, Australia

Scientific classification
- Kingdom: Plantae
- Clade: Tracheophytes
- Division: Polypodiophyta
- Class: Polypodiopsida
- Order: Gleicheniales
- Family: Gleicheniaceae
- Genus: Gleichenia
- Species: G. microphylla

Binomial name
- Gleichenia microphylla R.Br.

Synonyms
- Platyzoma microphyllum R.Br. Pteris platyzomopsis Christenh. & H.Schneid. G. semivestita Labill.

= Gleichenia microphylla =

Species of plant

Gleichenia microphylla is a small fern growing in Australia and New Zealand.

Some of the other common names include: scrambling coral fern, umbrella fern, parasol fern, carrier tangle, matua-rarauhe, matuku, tapuwae kotuku, waewae kaka, waewae kotuku and waewae matuku.

A common plant, often seen growing under waterfalls, in swamps, under cliffs and in tall open forest. It prefers high humidity and good levels of sunshine and moisture. It can form large colonies.

In 1810 it appeared in Prodromus Florae Novae Hollandiae, authored by Robert Brown.

== Description ==
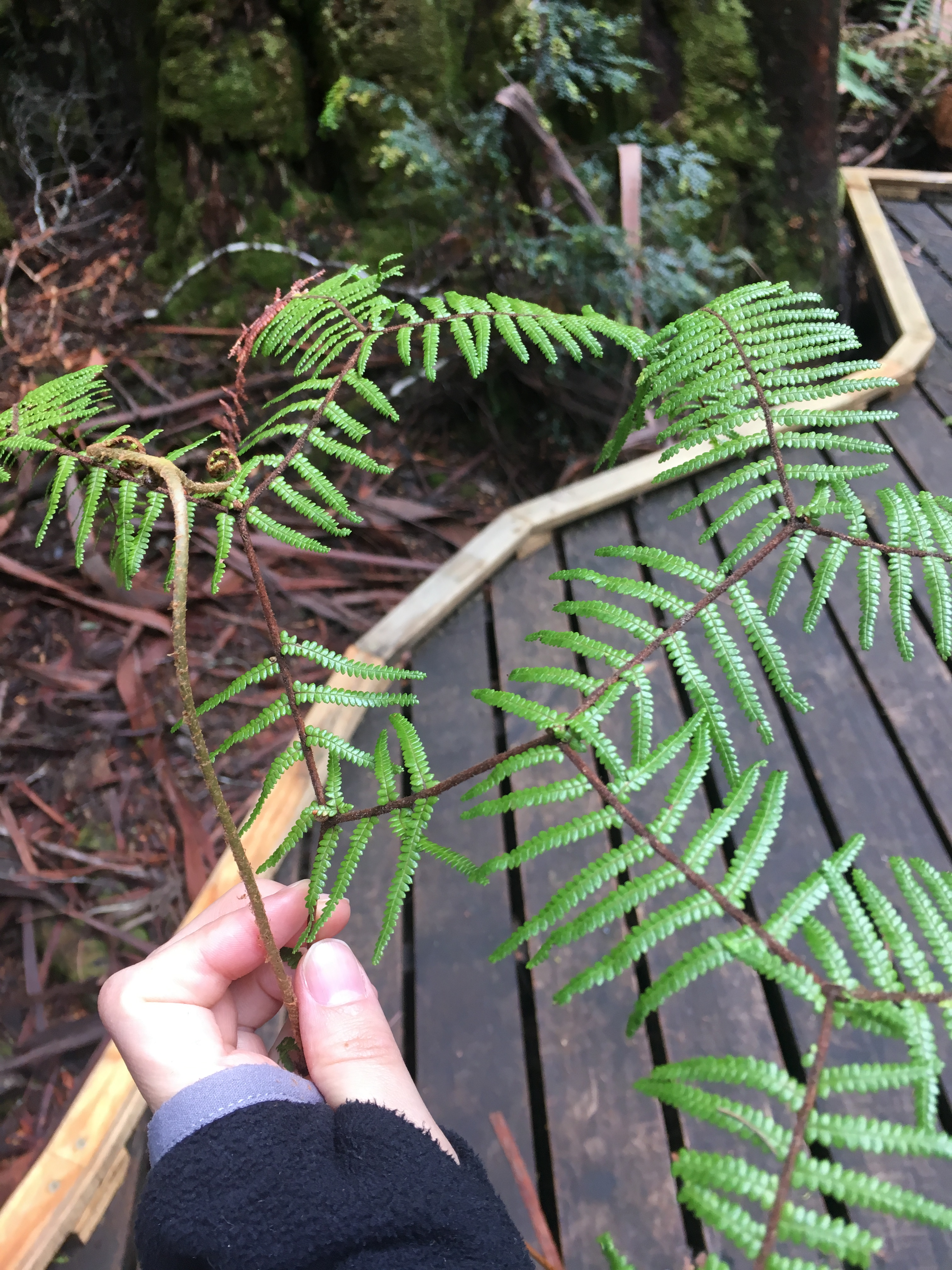
The fronds of G. microphylla are forked several times.

Gleichenia microphylla's rachis on major branches has conspicuous and numerous bundles of bristles that are shiny, short, and amber to dark brown in colour. It also has less numerous and scattered fringed scales. It has 2 to 6 cm long linear ultimate branches with close-set pinnules. The undersurface of pinna-rachis has no hairs or scales. The uncoiling tips and young rachises are covered in red-brown bristles and have some fringed scales. The pinnules are 1 to 3 mm long and have a blunt, oblong-triangular shape. The lower surface of the pinnules are flat or slightly concave and never rolled inwards on all edges to make a pocket. The underside of a fertile frond has 2 to 4 of sori (or rarely 1 or 5). The sporangia have a shiny, bright yellow to yellow-brown colour and exist around the central projection. Fronds are forked several times and they grow to 2 to 4 m in length.

== Distribution and habitat ==
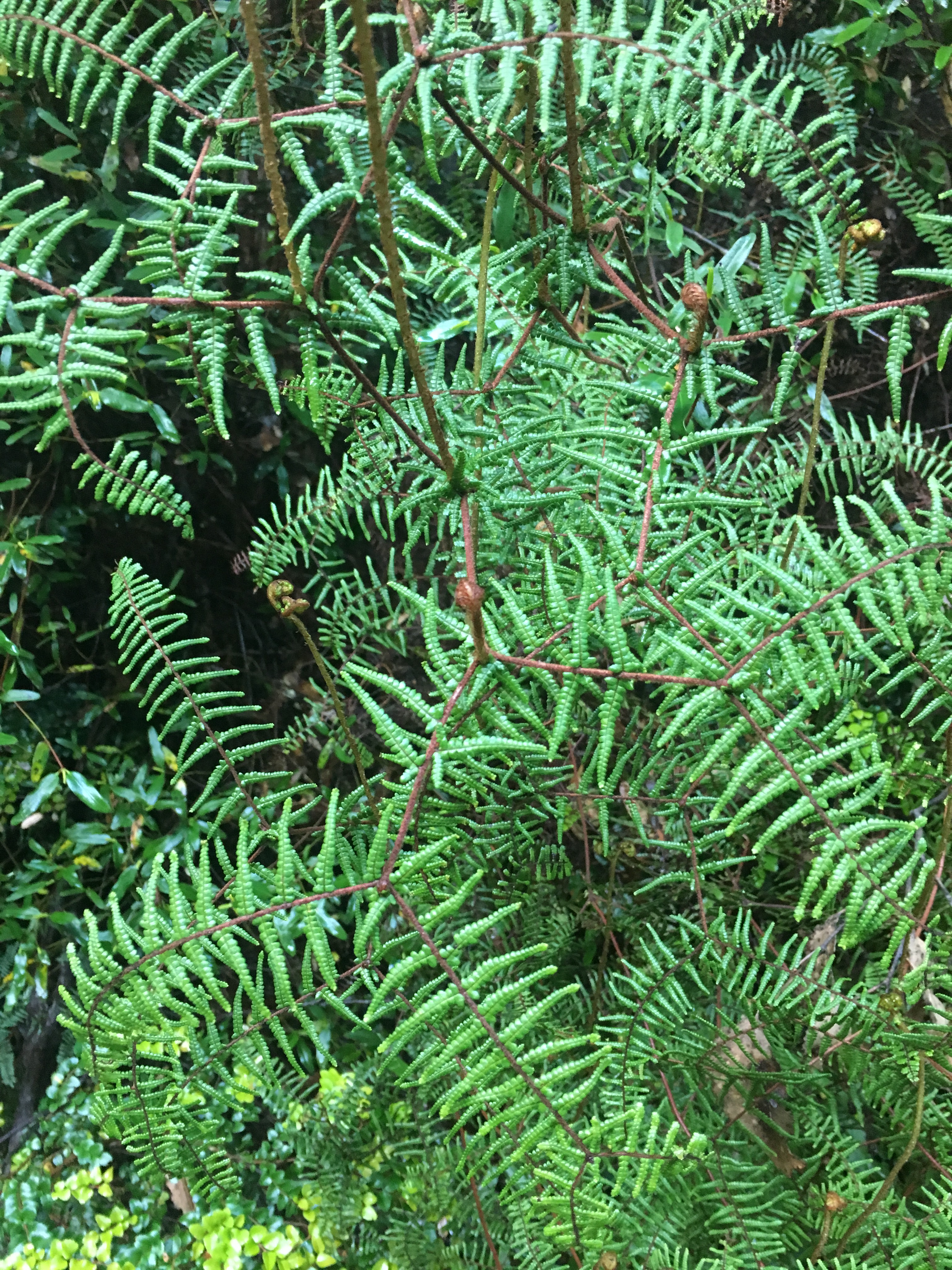
G. microphylla at Big Tree Forest Reserve in Tasmania, Australia

=== Habitat ===
Gleichenia microphylla forms large scrambling colonies in sunny damp sites around swamps, on exposed banks and along creek margins. Stunted plants are often seen in wet rock crevices. It occurs from near sea level to 600 m above sea level, reaching 760 m on Stewart Island, New Zealand. G. micorophylla is widespread in Australia and New Zealand.

=== Australia ===
In Australia, it is common in Victoria and Tasmania (including Flinders Island and King Island) and also can be found in New South Wales, Queensland, Northern Territory, South Australia, and Australian Capital Territory. It has not been recorded in Western Australia.

=== New Zealand ===
In New Zealand, it can be found both in North Island and South Island and also in Stewart Island but often absent from the eastern side of the islands. In North Island, it can be seen in Northland, Auckland, Volcanic plateau, Taranaki, and Southern North Island. In South Island, It can be seen in Western Nelson, Sounds-Nelson, Marlborough, Westland, Fiordland, and, Southland.

=== Other distribution ===
It is said that G. microphylla is also found in Southeast Asia, Malesia, and New Caledonia. However, the records in those areas are not well supported. G. semivestita Labill., which is a synonym of G. microphylla was recorded from New Caledonia. However, the presence of G. microphylla in New Caledonia is not confirmed from modern collections. Therefore, it is considered that Labillardière (1824), who named G. semivestita in New Caledonia, has mistakenly attributed Australian material of G. microphylla to New Caledonia. Although Malesian plants have also been attributed to G. microphylla, some of those plants are distinctly different from Australian and New Zealand material. Therefore, the reexamination of those plants is required.

== Hybridisation ==
Gleichenia microphylla can hybridise with G. dicarpa and the hybrids are called G. xpunctulata and they are morphologically intermediate between both species. It can be found in the broad area of overlapping distributions of the parental species.
