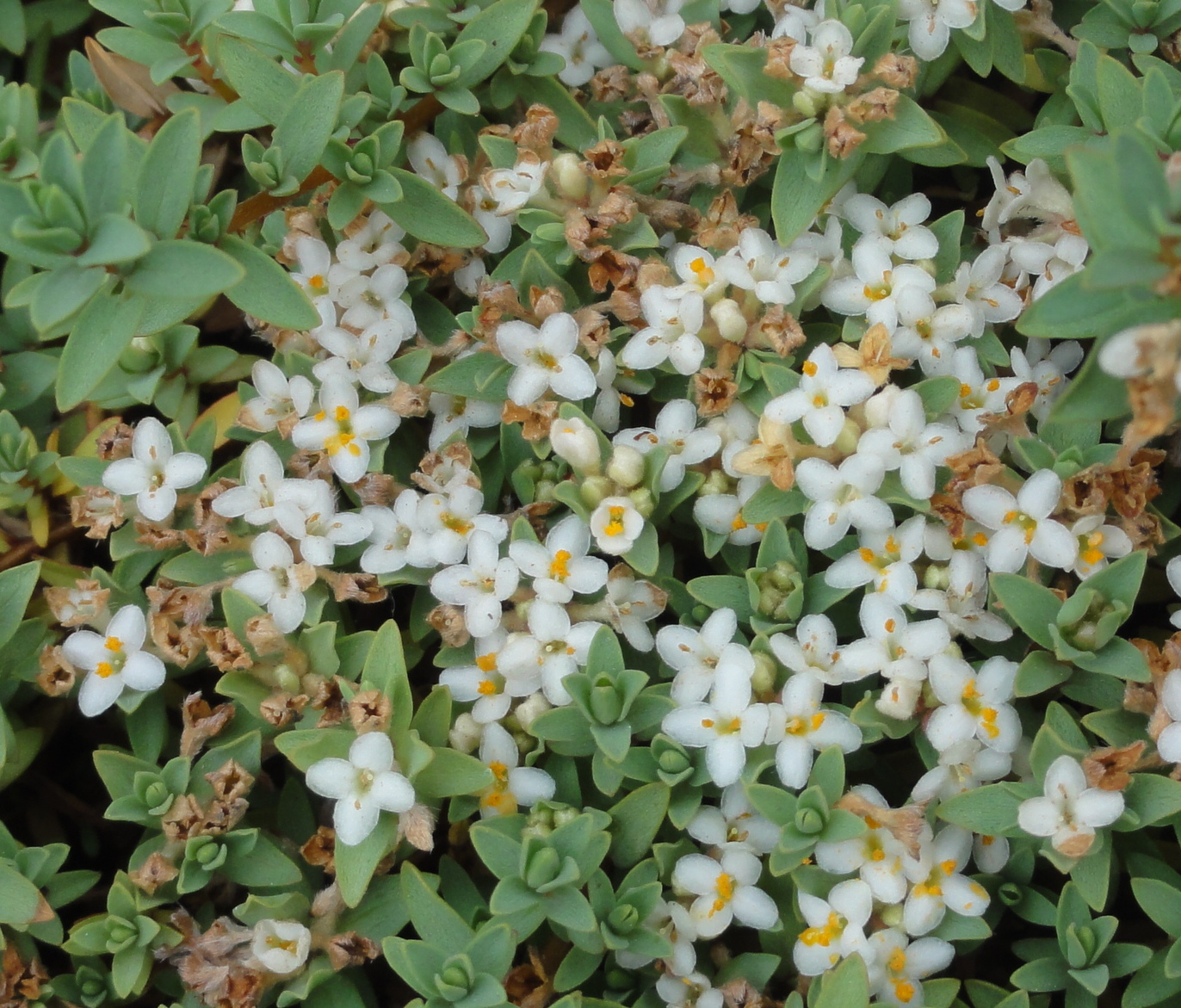

Scientific classification
- Kingdom: Plantae
- Clade: Tracheophytes
- Clade: Angiosperms
- Clade: Eudicots
- Clade: Rosids
- Order: Malvales
- Family: Thymelaeaceae
- Genus: Pimelea
- Species: P. prostrata

Binomial name
- Pimelea prostrata Willd.

= Pimelea prostrata =

Species of plant

Pimelea prostrata, commonly known as Strathmore weed, New Zealand Daphne, and Pinātoro (Māori) is a species of small shrub, of the family Thymelaeaceae. It is endemic to New Zealand and has small white flowers and blue green leaves.

== Description ==
Pimelea prostrata is a low growing prostrate shrub. It has blue green leaves and small white flowers. Its stems range from 30 to 60 cm long, depending on the variety.

- Pimelea prostrata subsp. prostrata has 30cm long stems and yellowish-brown branchlets.

== Classification ==
Pimelea prostrata has five subspecies:

- Pimelea prostrata subsp. prostrata
- Pimelea prostrata subsp. seismica
- Pimelea prostrata subsp. thermalis
- Pimelea prostrata subsp. ventosa
- Pimelea prostrata subsp. vulcanica

== Etymology ==
Pimelea is the shortened version of the Greek: Pimeleoides, which means "resembling Pimelea," a genus in the family Thymelaeaceae, prostrata describes the way in which it grows; Prostrate lying flat on the ground.

== Toxins ==
Like many species of Pimelea, it is poisonous to animals, particularly horses. It was originally used as a source of the toxin prostratin, which can serve as a tumor-inhibiting agent.
