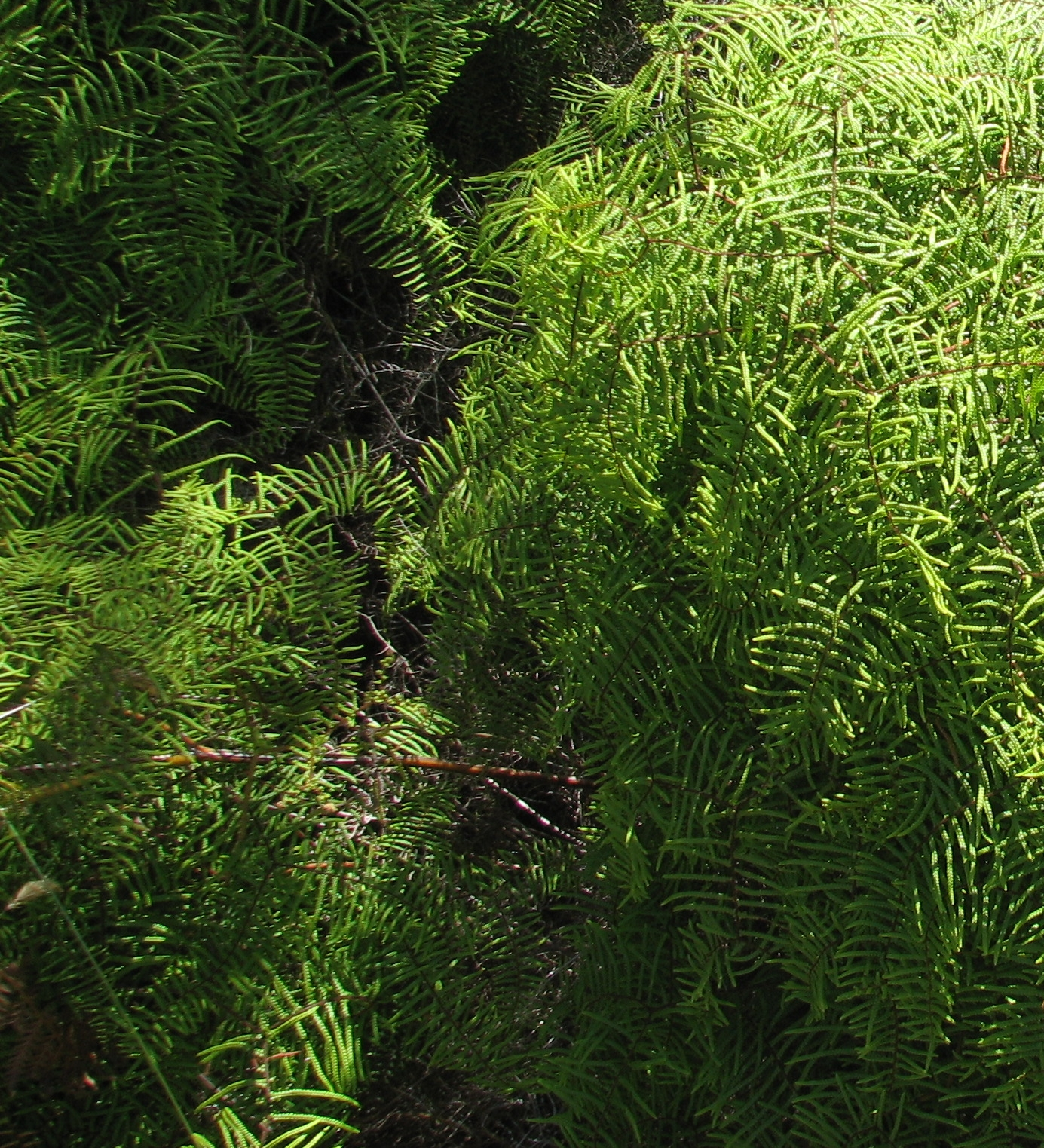
- Gleichenia microphylla, Mornington Peninsula, Victoria

Scientific classification
- Kingdom: Plantae
- Clade: Embryophytes
- Clade: Tracheophytes
- Division: Polypodiophyta
- Class: Polypodiopsida
- Order: Gleicheniales
- Family: Gleicheniaceae
- Genus: Gleichenia; Sm.

Type species
- Gleichenia polypodioides (L.) Smith

Species
- See text

Synonyms
- Calymella K.B.Presl 1836; Gleicheniastrum K.B.Presl 1847

= Gleichenia =

Genus of ferns

Gleichenia is a genus of ferns. Its closest relative is the genus Stromatopteris, restricted to New Caledonia.

== Description ==
These ferns have creeping rhizomes. The compound eaves fork multiple times, with the final leaf lobes ending in a pinnate arrangement. The sori are found at the bottom of the leaves and are made of a few sporangia. They are not covered by an indusium (protective covering). The sori occur in a unique chamber in the laminar pits - a feature found only in this genus.

== Fossil record ==
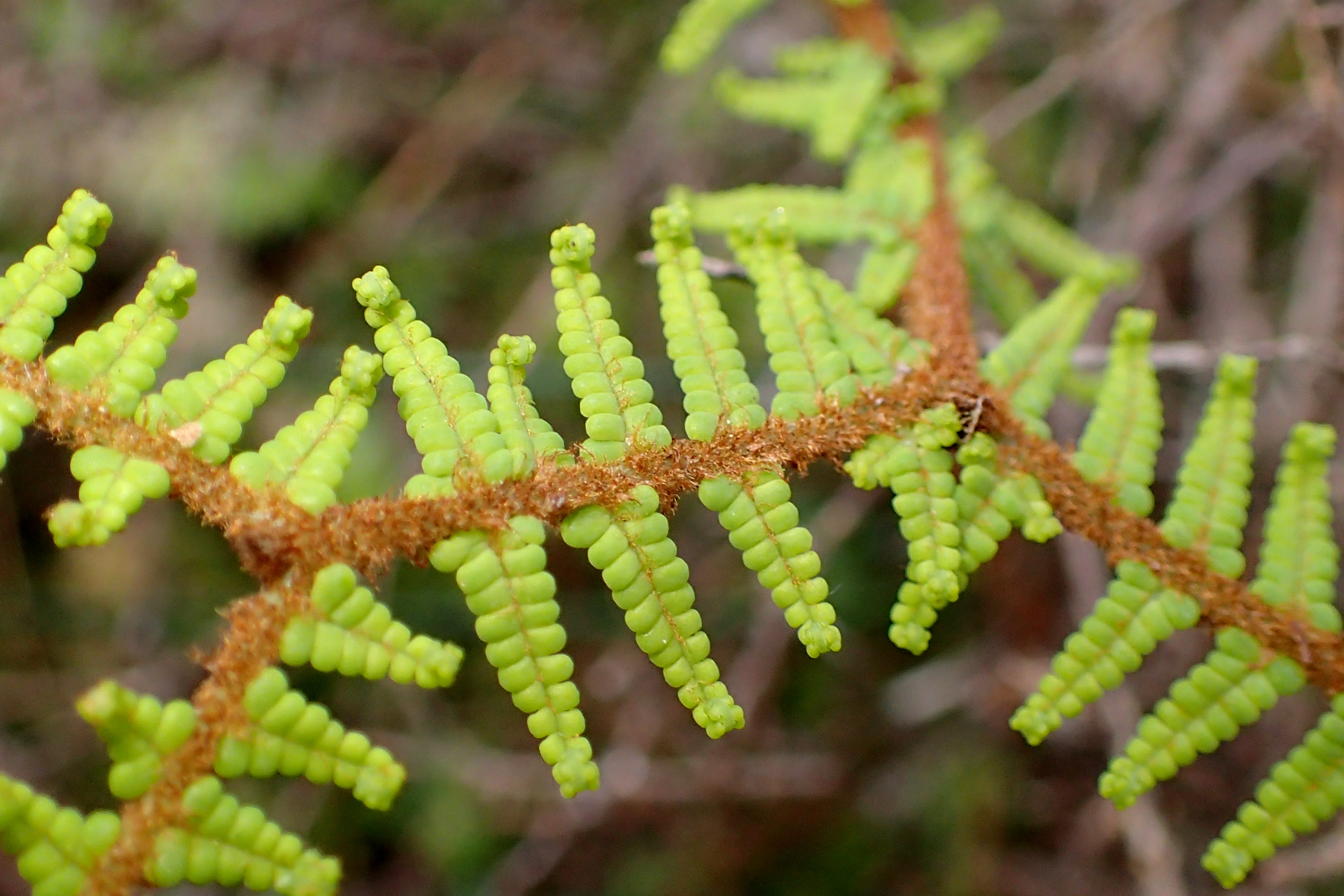
Gleichenia dicarpa leaves

The fossil record indicates that this genus had emerged by the late Jurassic period, although it was far more common in the early Cretaceous period. There is some evidence that it may have emerged even earlier - in the upper Triassic period. There are, however, multiple genera in the fossil record that show a similar leaf branching pattern to Gleichenia, which can make it difficult to determine the exact identity of a specimen that does not have adequately preserved fruiting bodies.

Fossils have been found in across a wide geographic range including:

- The Pariwar formation in India (Jurassic-Cretaceous boundary)
- Gardeshwar in India (early Cretaceous)
- The Silty Beds of Bedfordshire in England (early Albian age, early Cretaceous).
- The USA (Cretaceous)
- New South Wales, Australia (Miocene epoch, Neogene period)

== Phylogeny ==
The following species are recognised as of February 2023:

Phylogeny of Gleichenia

- - G. polypodioides (L.) Sm. (Kystervaring)
  - - G. alpina R.Br. (Alpine coral fern)
    - - - G. mendellii (G.Schneid.) S.B.Andrews
        - G. microphylla R.Br. (Scrambling coral fern, parasol fern, umbrella fern)
      - - G. dicarpa R.Br. (Pouched coral fern, tangle fern)
        - - G. rupestris R.Br.
          - - G. abscida Rodway (Dwarf coral fern)
            - G. inclusisora Perrie, L.D.Sheph. & Brownsey

Unassigned species:

- Gleichenia alstonii Holttum
- Gleichenia elongata Baker
- Gleichenia matthewii Holttum
- Gleichenia paleacea (Copel.) Holttum
- Gleichenia peltophora Copel.
- Gleichenia ×punctulata Colenso
- Gleichenia vulcanica Blume
