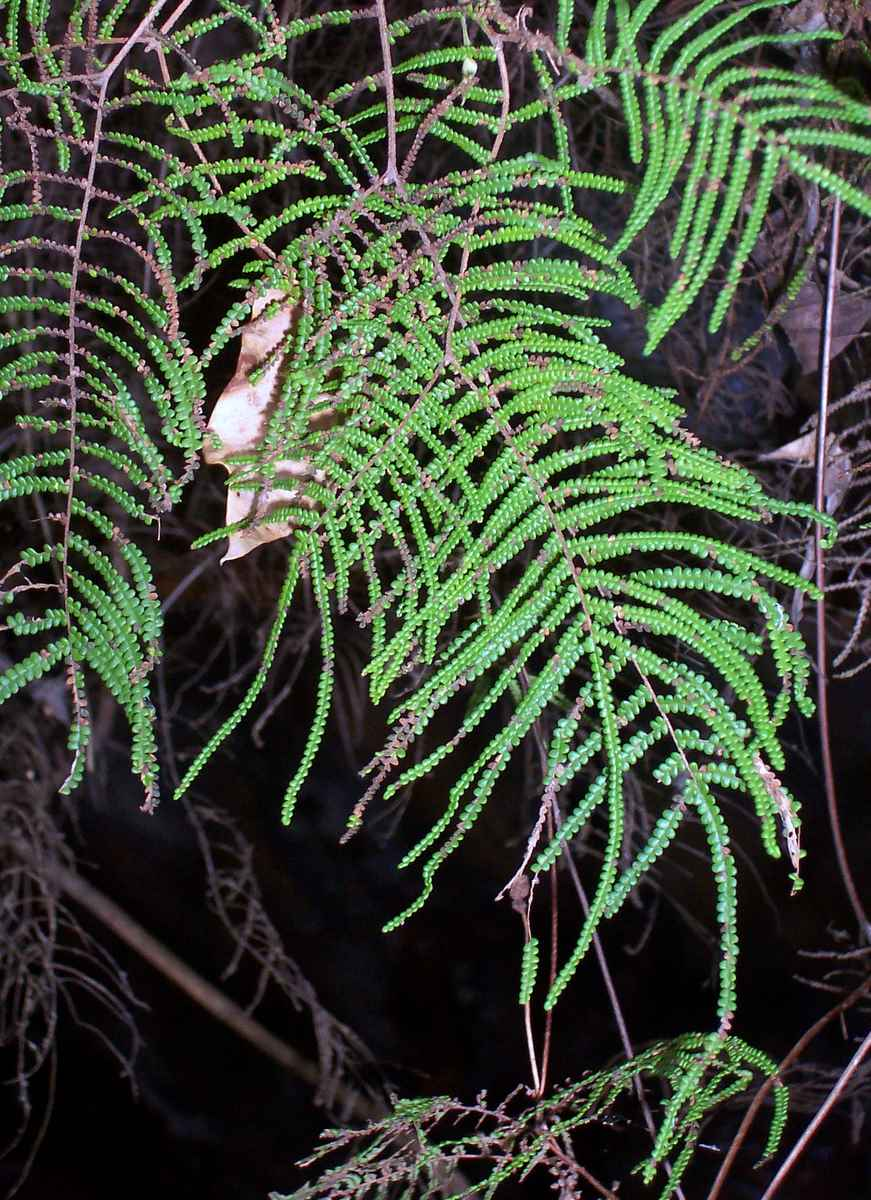
- Coral Fern at Roseville Chase, Australia

Scientific classification
- Kingdom: Plantae
- Clade: Tracheophytes
- Division: Polypodiophyta
- Class: Polypodiopsida
- Order: Gleicheniales
- Family: Gleicheniaceae
- Genus: Gleichenia
- Species: G. dicarpa

Binomial name
- Gleichenia dicarpa R.Br.

Synonyms
- Gleichenia circinnata Sw.

= Gleichenia dicarpa =

Species of plant

Gleichenia dicarpa, commonly known as pouched coral fern or tangle fern, is a small fern of the family Gleicheniaceae found in eastern Australia, New Caledonia and New Zealand. It can also be found in parts of Southeast Asia. It forms tangled thickets in wet places such as swamps and riverbanks.

== Taxonomy ==
Collected by Joseph Banks and Daniel Solander in November 1769 at Mercury Bay in New Zealand, G. dicarpa appeared in the 1810 work Prodromus Florae Novae Hollandiae, authored by prolific botanist Robert Brown. Its genus name honours the German botanist W.F. von Gleichen, and its species name is Ancient Greek for "two fruit". Common names in New Zealand include tangle fern, Spider fern, and swamp umbrella fern. Australian common names include pouched coral fern, and wiry coral fern.

The taxonomy of G. dicarpa is more complicated than previously thought; a genetic study of the DNA of Gleicheniaceae from New Zealand and Tasmania indicate that a smaller shorter-branched "upland" form from New Zealand is in fact more closely related to the Tasmanian G. alpina than to other New Zealand G. dicarpa. Furthermore, G. microphylla is also nested within various populations of G. dicarpa.

== Description ==
G. dicarpa consists of numerous fronds arising more or less vertically from a thin many branched rhizome. Each frond can reach 2 m (7 ft) in length with pinnae up to 4 cm (1.6 in) long. The smallest end-branches, known as pinnules, are a mere 1 to 1.5 mm long and recurved margins that give them a cup- or pouch shape. In fertile fronds, two spores lie within the pouch. It is these pouches which give the fern its common name. The spores are yellowish and darken to black when ripe. Fronds growing in sunnier areas often have a bleached yellow coloration.

== Distribution and habitat ==
G. dicarpa is found throughout eastern Australia, from Queensland through New South Wales and Victoria and in Tasmania. It is widespread in Tasmania, where it is found up to altitudes of 900 m (3000 ft). It is widely distributed in New Zealand, where it is found on North, South and Stewart Islands, as well as the Chatham Islands. It is also found in New Caledonia.

A common plant, often seen growing under waterfalls, in peatlands, under cliffs and in tall open forest. It can grow in nutrient poor conditions, preferring high humidity and good levels of sunshine and moisture. Its tangled roots collect detritus and prevent erosion. It can also be a pioneer species of disturbed ground.

== Cultivation ==
Although not commercially available, G. dicarpa can be readily propagated from spores, and grows as long as it is not allowed to dry out and is not otherwise disturbed. It prefers acidic soil and sunny aspect.
