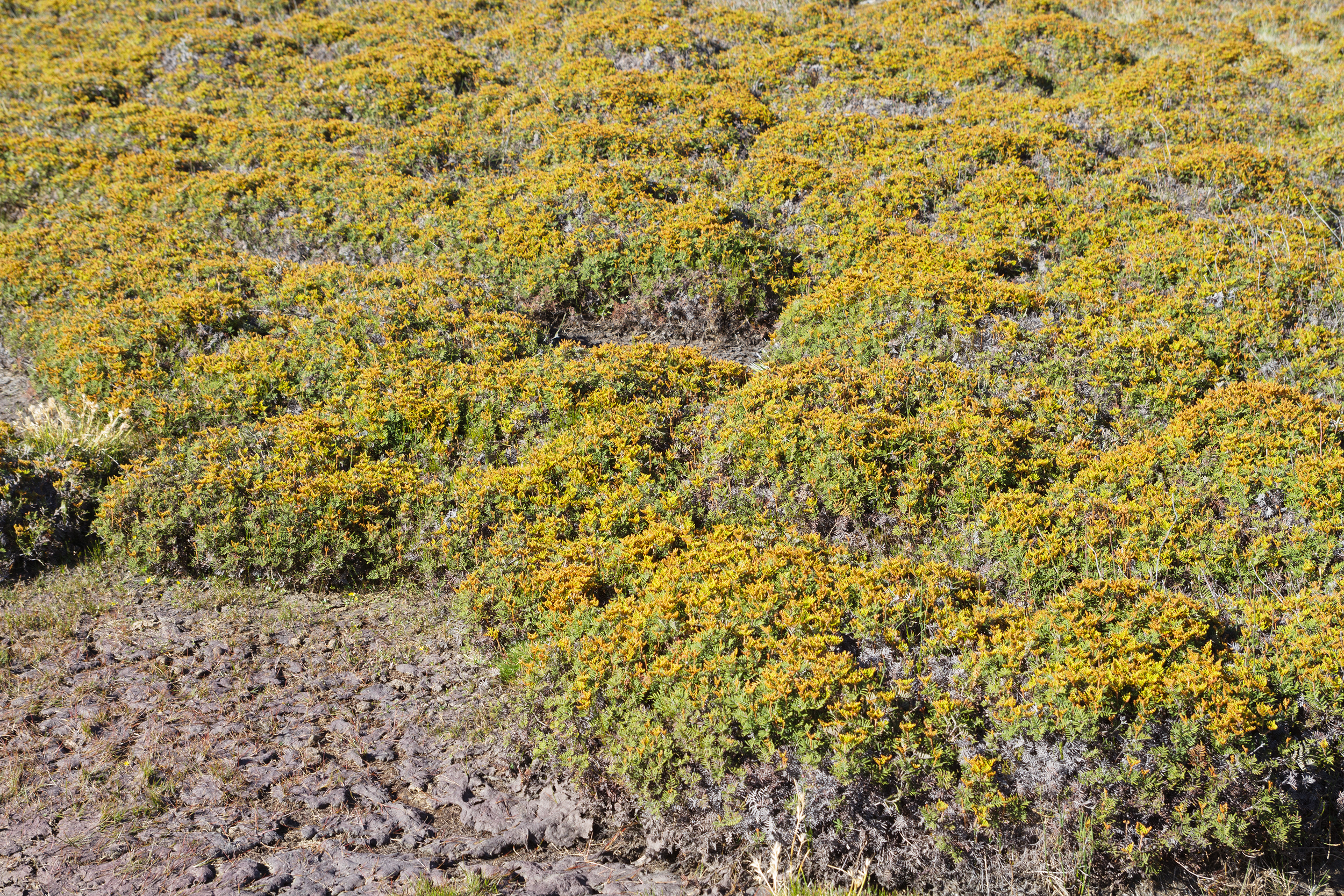
- Gleichenia alpina in Walls of Jerusalem National Park, Tasmania

Scientific classification
- Kingdom: Plantae
- Clade: Tracheophytes
- Division: Polypodiophyta
- Class: Polypodiopsida
- Order: Gleicheniales
- Family: Gleicheniaceae
- Genus: Gleichenia
- Species: G. alpina

Binomial name
- Gleichenia alpina R.Br.

Synonyms
- Mertensia alpina (R.Br.) Poir.; Gleichenia dicarpa var. alpina (R.Br.) Hook.f.; Platyzoma alpinum (R.Br.) Desv.; Calymella alpina (R.Br.) C.Presl

= Gleichenia alpina =

Species of fern

Gleichenia alpina, commonly known as alpine coral-fern, is a small fern species that occurs in Tasmania and New Zealand. It grows in alpine and subalpine areas with moist soils and is a part of the Gleicheniaceae family.

The species was first formally described by botanist Robert Brown in 1810.

== Description ==
Gleichenia alpina is a common native ground fern that grows in boggy alpine and subalpine vegetation. It has the typical Gleichenia foliage, which is repeatedly dichotomously divided before ending in pinnate laminas. The distinctive feature is deep pouches densely covered with hairs on the underside of the pinnules.

Gleichenia alpina is characterised by comparatively short frond axes and the dense orange-brown (becoming pale) scales that obscure the abaxial surface of the lamina. Its strongly pouched ultimate segments mean it can be confused only with G. dicarpa. From that species, G. alpina can be distinguished by: the absence of stellate scales with patent branches on the β costae; the strongly convex adaxial surface of the ultimate segments; only 0–1 (rarely 2) pseudodichotomous forks in the pinnae (excluding growth from pinna buds); the absence of accessory leaflets around the rachis bud; and pinna buds that usually extend, often more than once.

In contrast, G. dicarpa has: stellate scales with patent branches (curled in Chatham Islands’ plants) on the abaxial and/or adaxial surfaces of the β costae; complanate or weakly convex adaxial surface of the ultimate segments; 1–4 (rarely 0 or 5) pseudodichotomous forks in the pinnae (excluding growth from pinna buds); usually accessory leaflets around the rachis bud; and pinna buds that extend only occasionally and rarely more than once.

== Habitat ==
Gleichenia alpina occurs in subalpine bogs and scrub, and other cold, open habitats. It usually grows in the open, often growing through other vegetation, and rarely extends into forest. It favours wet ground, and is often found with Empodisma.

== Distribution ==
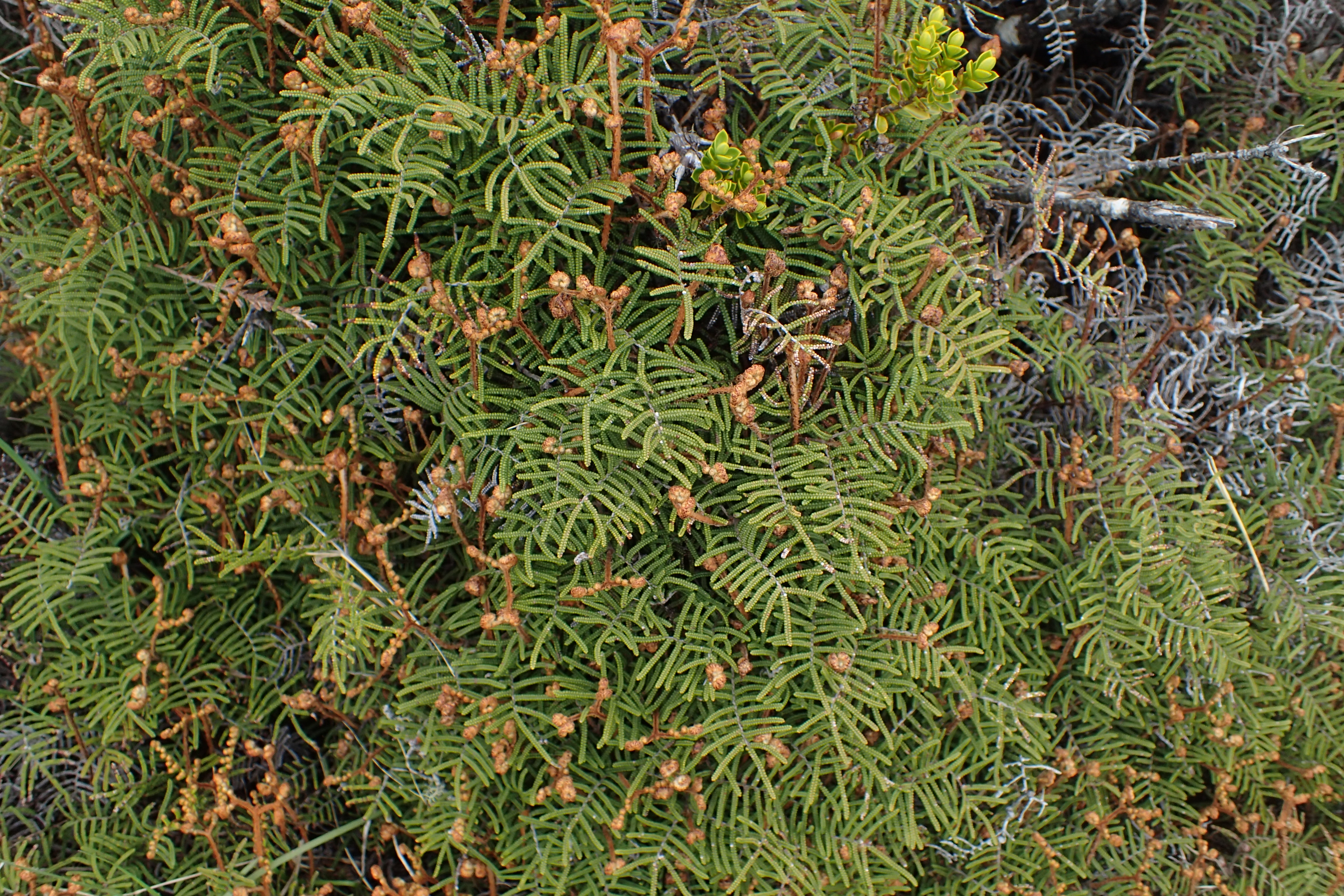
Gleichenia alpina typical form

Tasmania: Found throughout Tasmania's alpine areas above 700m, some distributions include the Central Plateau, Walls of Jerusalem, Cradle Valley and Mt Field National Park.

New Zealand: North and South Islands. Exact distribution still unclear but plants matching G. alpina are known from the Central Volcanic Plateau, Tākaka, and Denniston Plateau, and plants sharing the same haplotype as limited sampling of Tasmanian G. alpina are known from Mount Somers / Te Kiekie (Perrie et al. 2007). Currently, the status of G. alpina in New Zealand requires further study as some reduced forms of G. dicarpa can be easily confused with it.
